= Application Foundation Classes =

The Application Foundation Classes (AFC) were a graphical framework for building Java-based graphical user interfaces (GUIs), developed by Microsoft and shipped as part of the Microsoft SDK for Java. AFC was based on the Abstract Window Toolkit (AWT), but its architecture made it easier to extend components to better fit user needs.

AFC components were announced to be cross-platform, but they worked better with Microsoft Java Virtual Machine, and support on non-Windows platform was problematic.

== History ==
The release of AFC (along with J/Direct (instead of JNI), and WFC), was part of an effort by Microsoft to gain leadership on the growing Java community.

With the release of Java Foundation Classes, interest for AFC dropped, and they later were no longer maintained.

== See also ==
- Java Foundation Classes
- Swing (Java)
