= Java Foundation Classes =

Graphical framework

The Java Foundation Classes (JFC) are a graphical framework for building portable Java-based graphical user interfaces (GUIs). JFC consists of the Abstract Window Toolkit (AWT), Swing and Java 2D. Together, they provide a consistent user interface for Java programs, regardless of whether the underlying user interface system is Windows, macOS or Linux.

== History ==
AWT existed before JFC. AWT was heavily criticized for being little more than a wrapper around the native graphical capabilities of the host platform. That meant that the standard widgets in the AWT relied on those capabilities of the native widgets, requiring the developer to also be aware of the differences between host platforms.

An alternative graphics library called the Internet Foundation Classes was developed in more platform-independent code by Netscape.

At the same time, another graphics library, called Application Foundation Classes (AFC), was developed independently by Microsoft. It was made to be easier to extend the graphic components, but was primarily aimed for use with the Microsoft Java Virtual Machine.

On April 2, 1997, Sun Microsystems and Netscape announced their intention to combine IFC with other technologies to form the "Java Foundation Classes". The "Java Foundation Classes" were later renamed "Swing", adding the capability for a pluggable look and feel of the widgets. This allowed Swing programs to maintain a platform-independent code base, but mimic the look of a native application. The release of JFC made IFC obsolete, and dropped interest for Microsoft's AFC.

Using the Java programming language, Java Foundation Classes (JFC) are pre-written code in the form of class libraries (coded routines) that give the programmer a comprehensive set of graphical user interface (GUI) routines to use. The Java Foundation Classes are comparable to the Microsoft Foundation Class Library (MFC). JFC is an extension of the original Java Abstract Windowing Toolkit (AWT). Using JFC and Swing, an additional set of program components, a programmer can write programs that are independent of the windowing system within a particular operating system.

== See also ==
- Standard Widget Toolkit
- Java Class Library
