= Visual J Sharp =

Programming language

Visual J#
- Paradigm: Object-oriented, structured, imperative
- Developer: Microsoft
- First appeared: July 1, 2002; 23 years ago
- Final release: v2.0 Second Edition / 18 May 2007; 19 years ago
- Platform: .NET Framework
- Website: msdn2.microsoft.com/en-us/vjsharp/default.aspx

Influenced by
- C#, Java and Visual J++

Visual J# (pronounced "jay-sharp") is a discontinued implementation of the J# programming language that was a transitional language for programmers of Java and Visual J++ languages, so they could use their existing knowledge and applications with the .NET Framework. It was introduced in 2002 and discontinued in 2007, with support for the final release of the product continuing until October 2017.

J# worked with Java bytecode as well as source so it could be used to transition applications that used third-party libraries, even if their original source code was unavailable. It was developed by the Hyderabad-based Microsoft India Development Center at HITEC City in India.

The implementation of Java in Visual J++, MSJVM, did not pass Sun's compliance tests leading to a lawsuit from Sun, Java's creator, and creation of J#. Microsoft ceased such support for the MSJVM on December 31, 2007 (later Oracle bought Sun, and with it Java and its trademarks). Microsoft however, officially started distributing Java again in 2021 (though not bundled with Windows or its web browsers as before with J++), i.e. their build of Oracle's OpenJDK, which Microsoft plans to support for at least 6 years, for LTS versions, i.e. to September 2027 for Java 17.

== Fundamental differences between J# and Java ==
Java and J# use the same general syntax but there are non-Java conventions in J# to support the .NET environment. For example, to use .NET "properties" with a standard JavaBean class, it is necessary to prefix getter and setter methods with the Javadoc-like annotation:

/** @beanproperty */

...and change the corresponding private variable name to be different from the suffix of the getXxx/setXxx names.

J# does not compile Java-language source code to Java bytecode (.class files), and does not support Java applet development or the ability to host applets directly in a web browser, although it does provide a wrapper called Microsoft J# Browser Controls for hosting them as ActiveX objects. Finally, Java Native Interface (JNI) and raw native interface (RNI) are substituted with P/Invoke; J# does not support remote method invocation (RMI).

InfoWorld said: "J#'s interface to the .NET framework is solid, but not as seamless as C#. In particular, J# code cannot define new .NET attributes, events, value types, or delegates. J# can make use of these language constructs if they are defined in an assembly written in another language, but its inability to define new ones limits J#'s reach and interoperability compared to other .NET languages."

Contrariwise, Microsoft documentation for Visual Studio 2005 details the definition of .NET delegates, events, and value types directly in J#.

Like C# and unlike Java, J# is able to use the C preprocessor directives.

== History of J# ==
In January 2007, Microsoft announced:

- That Microsoft would produce an updated version of Visual J# 2.0, including a 64-bit redistributable version, called J# 2.0 Second Edition to meet customer demand for 64-bit runtime support. Microsoft released Visual J# 2.0 Second Edition in May 2007.
- Retirement of the J# language and Java Language Conversion Assistant from future versions of Visual Studio. The last version, shipping with Visual Studio 2005, was supported until 2015.
- Calling J# code from .NET 4.0 code would fail unless vjsnativ.dll was pre-loaded.

The download of Visual J# 2005 Express Edition is no longer available from Microsoft's website.

Visual J# is out of support including the Visual J# 2.0 Redistributable Second Edition released in 2007, that was supported through to 2017 "(5 years mainstream and 5 years extended support) on EN-US locales."

== Example ==
The following is a simple example of Visual J#.

package Wikipedia.Examples;

import System.*;
import System.ComponentModel.Container;
import System.Drawing.Point;
import System.Drawing.Size;
import System.Windows.Forms.Application;
import System.Windows.Forms.Button;
import System.Windows.Forms.Form;
import System.Windows.Forms.Label;
import System.Windows.Forms.TextBox;

public class HelloWorld extends Form {
    private TextBox textBox;
    private Button button;
    private Label label;

    private Container components = null;

    public HelloWorld() {
        InitializeComponent();
    }

    protected void Dispose(boolean disposing) {
        if (disposing) {
            components.Dispose();
        }
        super.Dispose(disposing);
    }

    private void onClick(Object sender, EventArgs e) {
        label.set_Text(String.Format("Inputted text: {0}", textBox.get_Text());
    }

    #region Windows Form Designer generated code
    private void InitializeComponent() {
        this.textBox = new TextBox();
        this.button = new Button();
        this.label = new Label();
        this.SuspendLayout();

        // initialise text box
        textBox.set_Location(new Point(50, 30));
        textBox.set_Name("Hello world!");
        textBox.set_Size(new Size(120, 20));

        // initialise button
        button.set_Location(new Point(50, 60));
        button.set_Name("button");
        button.set_Text("Click me!");
        button.add_Click(new EventHandler(this.onClick));

        // initialise label
        label.set_Location(new Point(50, 90));
        label.set_Name("label");
        label.set_Size(new Size(200, 20));

        // initialise form
        set_AutoScaleBaseSize(new Size(6, 15));
        set_ClientSize(new Size(220, 140));
        get_Controls().Add(textBox);
        get_Controls().Add(button);
        get_Controls().Add(label);
        set_Name("form");
        set_Text("Hello, world!");
        ResumeLayout(false);
    }
    #endregion

    /** @attribute System.STAThread() */
    public static void main(String[] args) {
        Application.Run(new HelloWorld());
    }
}

== See also ==
- IKVM – a free implementation of Java for Mono and .NET Framework
