= Java AWT Native Interface =

Java programming interface for native access to Abstract Window Toolkit

Java AWT Native Interface (JAWT) is an interface for the Java programming language that enables rendering libraries compiled to native code to draw directly to a Java Abstract Window Toolkit (AWT) java.awt.Canvas object drawing surface.

The Java Native Interface (JNI) allows developers to add platform-dependent functionality to Java applications. The JNI enables developers to add time-critical operations like mathematical calculations and 3D rendering.

Previously, native 3D rendering was challenging because the native code did not have access to the graphic context. The AWT Native Interface is designed to give developers access to an AWT java.awt.Canvas for direct drawing with native code. In fact, the Java 3D API extension to the standard Java SE JDK relies heavily on the AWT Native Interface to render 3D objects in Java.

The AWT Native Interface is very similar to the JNI, and the steps are the same as those of the JNI. See the Java Native Interface article for an explanation of the JNI techniques employed by the AWT Native Interface. The AWT Native Interface was added to the Java platform with the J2SE 1.3 ("Kestrel") version.

== Native painting ==
One can paint as if it is a native application. In Windows, the JVM will pass a HWND and other window information to the native application so that the application will "know" where to draw. It could use GDI to draw a java.awt.Rectangle. The window information the native side needs will be in a JAWT_Win32DrawingSurfaceInfo structure (depending on the operating system) which can be retrieved with this line: dsi_win = (JAWT_Win32DrawingSurfaceInfo*)dsi->platformInfo;

== See also ==
- Java Native Interface
- Java Virtual Machine Tools Interface
