= Internet Foundation Classes =

The Internet Foundation Classes (IFC) is a GUI widget toolkit and graphics library for Java originally developed by Netcode Corporation and first released by Netscape Corporation on December 16, 1996.

The Java IFC was fairly close to the early versions of the Objective-C NeXTStep classes for NeXT. A builder tool was also included under the IFC umbrella that was close in spirit (but significantly limited in functionality) to NeXT's Interface Builder. This ecosystem was attractive to NeXT application developers interested in looking at the Java language.

== History ==
On April 2, 1997, Sun Microsystems and Netscape announced their intention to combine IFC with other technologies to form the Java Foundation Classes.

Ultimately, Sun merged the IFC with other technologies under the name "Swing", adding the capability for a pluggable look and feel of the widgets.

Because its technology has been merged to constitute Swing and Java 2D, IFC is now no longer maintained.

== Differences from Swing ==
Swing drew a lot of features from IFC:

- contrary to AWT, IFC were written in pure Java, thus being (at the time) browser-independent.
- IFC already provided two Layout managers, that would be later included in the standard JDK
- some IFC components were able to read HTML content from URLs, but the implementation was still far from reliable.

However, Swing also improved IFC in a lot of ways:

- IFC did not have a Model-View architecture
- contrary to Swing, the Look and feel of IFC components was written in the components themselves, making it impossible to change it easily.
- IFC components were not JavaBeans. IFC had a specific persistence mechanism, but it was a bit complex, and not compatible with the Java Serialization API.
- event mechanism was still raw, and the Event loop sometimes needed to be accessed directly.

== Examples ==
=== Hello World ===
This is the classic Hello world program in IFC:

import netscape.application.*;
import netscape.util.*;

public class HelloWorld extends Application {

   public void init() {
       super.init();
       // Create a text field
       TextField textField = new TextField(100, 24, 128, 24);
       // Set the string to be displayed in the text field.
       textField.setStringValue("Hello World");
       // Add the text field to the view hierarchy.
       mainRootView().addSubview(textField);
   }

    // This method allows HelloWorld to run as a stand alone application.
    public static void main(String args[]) {
        HelloWorld app = new HelloWorld ();
        ExternalWindow mainWindow = new ExternalWindow();

        app.setMainRootView(mainWindow.rootView());
        Size size = mainWindow.windowSizeForContentSize(320, 200);
        mainWindow.sizeTo(size.width, size.height);
        mainWindow.show();

        app.run();
    }
}

To be compared with the equivalent Java Swing code:

import javax.swing.*;

public class HelloWorld extends JFrame {
    public HelloWorld() {
       setDefaultCloseOperation(DISPOSE_ON_CLOSE);
       add(new JLabel("Hello, World!"));
    }

    public static void main(String[] args) {
        HelloWorld app = new HelloWorld();
        app.pack();
        app.setVisible(true);
    }
}
