= Chooser =

Chooser can refer to:

- Choosing, to select freely and after consideration.
- A user interface on a computer that allows the user to choose items from large collections of data.
  - Apple Chooser, an application for Macintosh systems.
  - Spectasia 3D Chooser, an application for Windows and Macintosh systems.
