= Java Native Access =

Java library

- Original authors: Todd Fast, Timothy Wall, Liang Chen
- Release: May 9, 2007
- Stable release: 5.17.0 / March 16, 2025; 15 months ago
- Written in: C and Java
- Operating system: Windows, macOS, Android, AIX, FreeBSD, Linux, OpenBSD, Solaris, Windows Mobile
- Platform: Java 1.4 or later (for JNA 3.5.2 or earlier), Java 1.6 for JNA 4.0.0 and later
- Size: 1.83 MB (archived)
- Type: Software Library
- License: LGPL version 2.1 or later and (from version 4.0 onward) the Apache Software License, version 2.0
- Website: github.com/java-native-access/jna
- Repository: github.com/java-native-access/jna

Java Native Access (JNA) is a community-developed library that provides Java programs easy access to native shared libraries without using the Java Native Interface (JNI). JNA's design aims to provide native access in a natural way with a minimum of effort. Unlike JNI, no boilerplate or generated glue code is required.

Since Java 22, the Foreign Function and Memory API was provided as a standard modern alternative.

== Architecture ==
The JNA library uses a small native library called foreign function interface library (libffi) to dynamically invoke native code. The JNA library uses native functions allowing code to load a library by name and retrieve a pointer to a function within that library, and uses libffi library to invoke it, all without static bindings, header files, or any compile phase. The developer uses a Java interface to describe functions and structures in the target native library. This makes it quite easy to take advantage of native platform features without incurring the high development overhead of configuring and building JNI code.

JNA is built and tested on macOS, Microsoft Windows, FreeBSD / OpenBSD, Solaris, Linux, AIX, Windows Mobile, and Android. It is also possible to tweak and recompile the native build configurations to make it work on most other platforms that run Java.

== Mapping types ==
The following table shows an overview of types mapping between Java and native code and supported by the JNA library.

Native Type	Size	Java Type	Common Windows Types
char, int8_t	8-bit integer	byte	BYTE, TCHAR
short, int16_t	16-bit integer	short	WORD
wchar_t, char16_t	16/32-bit character	char	TCHAR
int, int32_t	32-bit integer	int	DWORD
int, bool	boolean value	boolean	BOOL
long	32/64-bit integer	com.sun.jna.NativeLong	LONG
long long, int64_t	64-bit integer	long	__int64
float, float32_t	32-bit FP	float	
double, float64_t	64-bit FP	double	
char*	C string	java.lang.String	LPCSTR
void*	Pointer	com.sun.jna.Pointer	LPVOID, HANDLE, LPXXX

Note: The meaning of TCHAR changes between char and wchar_t according to some preprocessor definitions. LPCTSTR follows.

== Memory byte alignment for data structures ==
Native libraries have no standardized memory byte alignment flavor. JNA defaults to an OS platform specific setting, that can be overridden by a library specific custom alignment. If the alignment details are not given in the documentation of the native library, the correct alignment must be determined by trial and error during implementation of the Java wrapper.

== Example ==
The following program loads the local C standard library implementation and uses it to call the printf function.

Note: The following code is portable and works the same on Windows and POSIX (Linux / Unix / macOS) platforms.

package org.wikipedia.examples;

import com.sun.jna.Library;
import com.sun.jna.Native;
import com.sun.jna.Platform;

// Simple example of native library declaration and usage.
public class HelloWorld {
    public interface CLibrary extends Library {
        CLibrary INSTANCE = (CLibrary) Native.loadLibrary(
            (Platform.isWindows() ? "msvcrt" : "c"), CLibrary.class);
        void printf(String format, Object... args);
    }

    public static void main(String[] args) {
        CLibrary.INSTANCE.printf("Hello, World\n");
        for (int i = 0; i < args.length; i++) {
            CLibrary.INSTANCE.printf("Argument %d: %s\n", i, args[i]);
        }
    }
}

The following program loads the C POSIX library and uses it to call the standard mkdir function.

Note: The following code is portable and works the same on POSIX standards platforms.

package org.wikipedia.examples;

import com.sun.jna.Library;
import com.sun.jna.Native;

// Simple example of native C POSIX library declaration and usage.
public class Example {
    public interface Posix extends Library {
	    public int chmod(String filename, int mode);
	    public int chown(String filename, int user, int group);
	    public int rename(String oldpath, String newpath);
	    public int kill(int pid, int signal);
	    public int link(String oldpath, String newpath);
	    public int mkdir(String path, int mode);
	    public int rmdir(String path);
    }

    public static void main(String[] args) {
        // It is possible to load msvcrt for its partial POSIX support on Windows...
        Posix posix = (Posix) Native.loadLibrary("c", Posix.class);
        // but it will still fail on Windows due to /tmp being missing.
	    posix.mkdir("/tmp/newdir", 0777);
	    posix.rename("/tmp/newdir","/tmp/renamedir");
    }
}

The program below loads the Kernel32.dll and uses it to call the Beep and Sleep functions.

Note: The following code works only on Windows platforms.

package org.wikipedia.examples;

import com.sun.jna.Library;
import com.sun.jna.Native;

// Simple example of Windows native library declaration and usage.
public class Example {
    public interface Kernel32 extends Library {
        // FREQUENCY is expressed in hertz and ranges from 37 to 32767
        // DURATION is expressed in milliseconds
        public boolean Beep(int FREQUENCY, int DURATION);
        public void Sleep(int DURATION);
    }

    public static void main(String[] args) {
	    Kernel32 lib = (Kernel32) Native.loadLibrary("kernel32", Kernel32.class);
	    lib.Beep(698, 500);
	    lib.Sleep(500);
	    lib.Beep(698, 500);
    }
}

== See also ==
- JNAerator
- P/Invoke
- SWIG
