= Embrace, extend, and extinguish =

Anti-competitive business strategy

"Embrace, extend, and extinguish" (EEE), also known as "embrace, extend, and exterminate", is a phrase that the U.S. Department of Justice found to have been used internally by Microsoft to describe its strategy for entering product categories involving widely used open standards, extending those standards with proprietary capabilities, and using the differences to strongly disadvantage its competitors.

== Origin ==
The strategy and phrase "embrace and extend" were first described outside Microsoft in a 1996 article in The New York Times titled "Tomorrow, the World Wide Web! Microsoft, the PC King, Wants to Reign Over the Internet", in which writer John Markoff said, "Rather than merely embrace and extend the Internet, the company's critics now fear, Microsoft intends to engulf it." The phrase "embrace and extend" also appears in a facetious motivational song by an anonymous Microsoft employee, and in an interview of Steve Ballmer by The New York Times.

A variant of the phrase, "embrace, extend then innovate", is used in J Allard's 1994 memo "Windows: The Next Killer Application on the Internet" to Paul Maritz and other executives at Microsoft. The memo starts with a background on the Internet in general, and then proposes a strategy on how to turn Windows into the next "killer app" for the Internet:

In order to build the necessary respect and win the mindshare of the Internet community, I recommend a recipe not unlike the one we've used with our TCP/IP efforts: embrace, extend, then innovate. Phase 1 (Embrace): all participants need to establish a solid understanding of the infostructure and the community—determine the needs and the trends of the user base. Only then can we effectively enable Microsoft system products to be great Internet systems. Phase 2 (Extend): establish relationships with the appropriate organizations and corporations with goals similar to ours. Offer well-integrated tools and services compatible with established and popular standards that have been developed in the Internet community. Phase 3 (Innovate): move into a leadership role with new Internet standards as appropriate, enable standard off-the-shelf titles with Internet awareness. Change the rules: Windows become the next-generation Internet tool of the future.

— J Allard, Windows: The Next Killer Application on the Internet

The addition "extinguish" was introduced in the United States v. Microsoft Corp. antitrust trial when then vice president of Intel, Steven McGeady, used the phrase to explain Maritz's statement in a 1995 meeting with Intel that described Microsoft's strategy to "kill HTML by extending it".

== Strategy ==
The strategy's three phases are:

1. Embrace: Development of software substantially compatible with an Open Standard.
2. Extend: Addition of features not supported by the Open Standard, creating interoperability problems.
3. Extinguish: When extensions become a de facto standard because of their dominant market share, they marginalize competitors who are unable to support the new extensions.

Microsoft claims the original strategy is not anti-competitive, but rather an exercise to implement features it believes customers want.

== Examples by Microsoft ==
=== Browser incompatibilities ===
The plaintiffs in an antitrust case claimed Microsoft had added support for ActiveX controls in the Internet Explorer Web browser to break compatibility with Netscape Navigator, which used components based on Java and Netscape's own plugin system.

On CSS, data:, etc.: A decade after the original Netscape-related antitrust suit, the Web browser company Opera Software filed an antitrust complaint against Microsoft with the European Union, saying it "calls on Microsoft to adhere to its own public pronouncements to support these standards, instead of stifling them with its notorious 'Embrace, Extend and Extinguish' strategy".

=== Office documents ===
In a memo to the Office product group in 1998, Bill Gates stated: "One thing we have got to change in our strategy – allowing Office documents to be rendered very well by other people's browsers is one of the most destructive things we could do to the company. We have to stop putting any effort into this and make sure that Office documents very well depend on proprietary IE capabilities. Anything else is suicide for our platform. This is a case where Office has to avoid doing something to destroy Windows."

=== Java ===
The antitrust case's plaintiffs also accused Microsoft of using an "embrace and extend" strategy with regard to the Java platform, which was designed explicitly with the goal of developing programs that could run on any operating system, be it Windows, Mac, or Linux. They claimed that, by omitting the Java Native Interface (JNI) from its implementation and providing J/Direct for a similar purpose, Microsoft deliberately tied Windows Java programs to its platform, making them unusable on Linux and Mac systems. According to an internal communication, Microsoft sought to downplay Java's cross-platform capability and make it "just the latest, best way to write Windows applications". Microsoft paid Sun Microsystems US$20 million in January 2001 (equivalent to $36 million in 2025) to settle the resulting legal implications of their breach of contract.

Sun sued Microsoft over Java again in 2002 and Microsoft agreed to settle out of court for US$2 billion (equivalent to US$3.4 billion in 2025).

=== Instant messaging ===
In 2001, CNET described an instance concerning Microsoft's instant messaging program. "Embrace" AOL's IM protocol, the de facto standard of the 1990s and early 2000s. "Extend" the standard with proprietary Microsoft addons which added new features, but broke compatibility with AOL's software. Gain dominance, since Microsoft had 95% OS share and their MSN Messenger was provided for free. Finally, "extinguish" and lock out AOL's IM software, since AOL was unable to use the modified MS-patented protocol.

=== Email protocols ===
Microsoft supported POP3, IMAP, and SMTP email protocols in their Microsoft Outlook email client. At the same time, they developed their own email protocol, MAPI, which has since been documented but is largely unused by third parties. Microsoft has announced that they would end support for the less secure basic authentication, which lacks support for multi-factor authentication, access to Exchange Online APIs for Office 365 customers, which disables most use of IMAP or POP3 and requires significant upgrades to support the more secure OAuth2 based authentication in applications in order to continue to use those protocols; some customers have responded by simply shutting off older protocols.

== Web browsers ==
=== Netscape ===
During the browser wars, Netscape implemented the "font" tag, among other HTML extensions, without seeking review from a standards body. With the rise of Internet Explorer, the two companies became locked in a dead heat to out-implement each other with non-standards-compliant features. In 2004, to prevent a repeat of the "browser wars", and the resulting morass of conflicting standards, the browser vendors Apple Inc. (Safari), Mozilla Foundation (Firefox), and Opera Software (Opera browser) formed the Web Hypertext Application Technology Working Group (WHATWG) to create open standards to complement those of the World Wide Web Consortium. Microsoft refused to join, citing the group's lack of a patent policy as the reason.

=== Google Chrome ===
With its dominance in the web browser market, Google has been accused of using Google Chrome and Blink development to push new web standards that are proposed in-house by Google and subsequently implemented by its services first and foremost. These have led to performance disadvantages and compatibility issues with competing browsers, and in some cases, developers intentionally refusing to test their websites on any other browser than Chrome. Tom Warren of The Verge went as far as comparing Chrome to Internet Explorer 6, the default browser of Windows XP that was often targeted by competitors due to its similar ubiquity in the early 2000s.

== See also ==
- AARD code
- Criticism of Microsoft
- Halloween documents
- Microsoft and open source
- Network effect
- Path dependence
- Vendor lock-in
- Enshittification
- Planned obsolescence
