= Spectasia =

Spectasia 3D Chooser

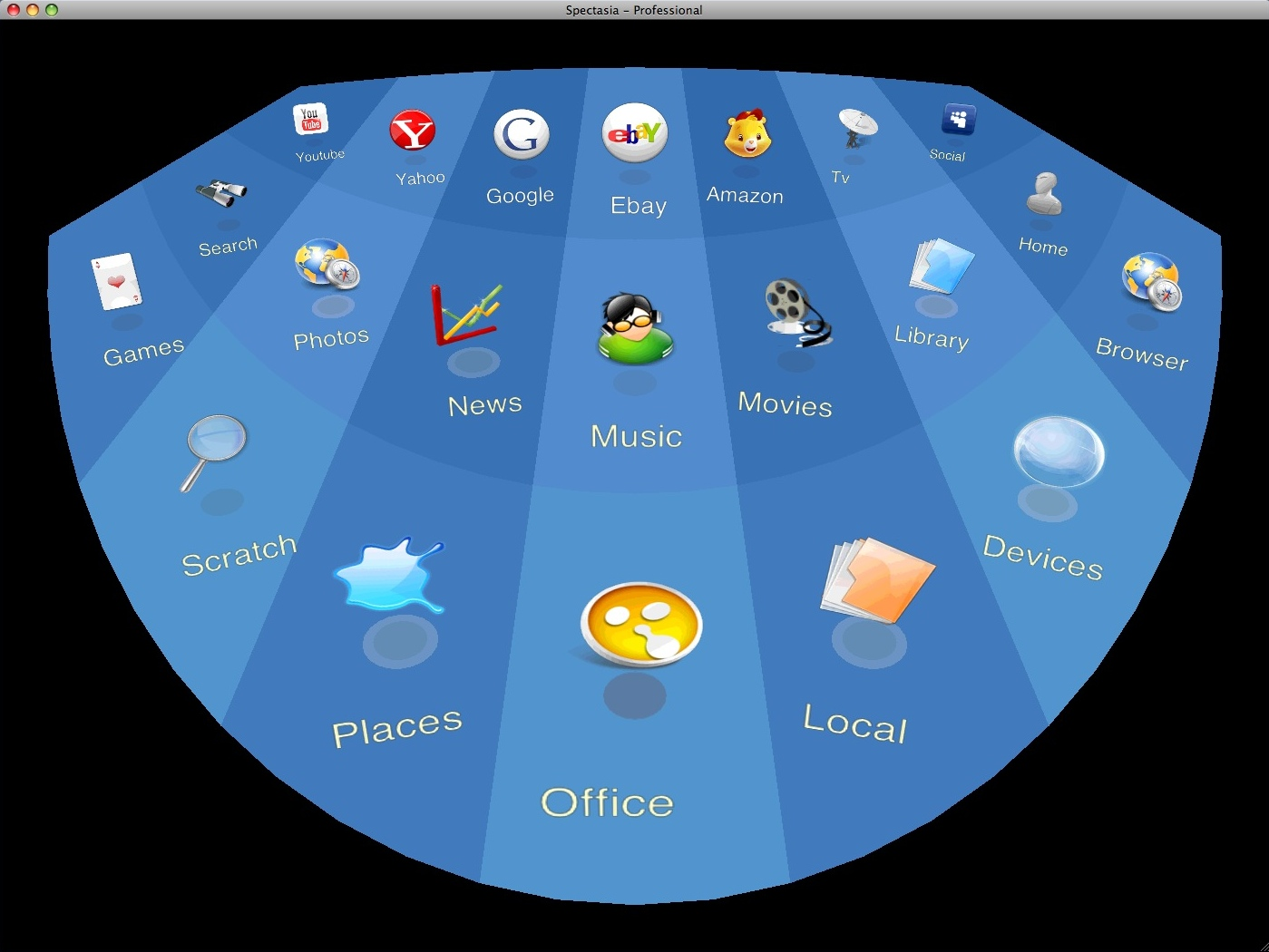
- Main screen of Spectasia 2009 Artemis running on Mac OS X
- Developer: MATT Services
- Initial release: 29 March 2009
- Written in: Java and Java 3D
- Operating system: Windows Vista and Mac OS X
- Available in: English
- Type: User interface
- License: MATT Services Terms of Service
- Website: www.spectasia.com

Spectasia is a document browser (chooser) application that has been developed by MATT Services. Spectasia was first released as a beta version for Microsoft Windows in July 2006, with the latest stable release on 23 March 2009.

The name Chooser refers to a software tool which allows the user to choose items visually, providing a lookable screen layout in which items are easy to spot. The term Chooser was also used for a defunct Macintosh finder application, but there is no direct relationship between the applications. Spectasia has been developed according to the design principles of the Lookable User Interface, which is related to Richard Bolt's concept of "Lookable Graphics".

Spectasia is commercial software and is available for use under a License from MATT Services.

== History ==
=== Design ===
The design concepts behind Spectasia go back to 2003 and were embedded in Alan Radley's idea for a Lookable User Interface. A number of prototype systems were developed and tested at MATT Services in the UK, and these systems were also demonstrated at major University Departments worldwide including University College London's department of Computer Science (2003), Imperial College London's Department of Electrical and Electronic Engineering (2003), The University of Hawaii's Department of Computer Science (2003) and the University of Toronto's Computational Vision Group (2005). In particular visits by Alan Radley to Kim H. Veltman at the University of Maastricht in 2002, and later at the VMMI (Virtual Maastricht McLuhan Institute) in 2005 and 2007 produced discussions which were instrumental to the development of the software as it is today.

=== Form of 3D ===
Spectasia employs a form of three-dimensional representation or 3D, specifically in order to provide an impression of depth for on-screen item locations. The subject of 3D representation has a long history and the associated literature is now extensive. Fortunately, some surveys exist.

It is noteworthy that Spectasia uses curvilinear perspective to present item choices to the user, being a form of perspective which has been ably described in the book Curvilinear Perspective: From Visual Space to the Constructed Image.

=== A Lookable User Interface ===
Spectasia names its visual representation a Lookable User Interface. A Lookable User Interface (LUI) is a user interface which provides a high degree of visual accessibility for digital content. Typically, a LUI enables the user to explore a 3D representation of a large collection of data items or object models. Often these items would comprise a Data Tree or Graph Structure.

At any moment, the LUI displays a small region of the overall graph, and the scene is automatically arranged in real time so as to provide good visibility for all of the Items present.

An overall visual context is created which allows items to adopt fixed visual reference locations, one relative to one another, and which fosters the visual articulation and mapping of the visual field.

LUIs are designed to operate as context interfaces, and inherently provide distinct and notionally fixed visual reference locations for data items.

=== Beta releases ===
A number of different beta versions of Spectasia were released between July 2006 and September 2008. The beta releases of Spectasia were downloaded more than 50,000 times and no major bugs were reported.

=== Announcement ===
The first stable release announcement for Spectasia (Version 7.2 code name Eos) was originally made on 30 October 2008, and the latest release (Spectasia 2009 Artemis) was made on 23 March 2009.

=== Public release ===
The Spectasia 3D Chooser was first publicly released for Microsoft Windows (XP and later only) and Mac OS X on 30 October 2008 in English, officially a stable version. Initial feedback suggests the software has been well received.

The latest releases of Spectasia have been through extensive user testing on Windows Vista and Mac OS X. The current software version (Spectasia 2009 Artemis) may work on some versions of Windows XP, but it is not supported on this platform.

=== Future ===
Plans are being made to include Spectasia in Dr Kim Veltman's SUMS project.

== Development ==
Primary design goals were improvements in browsing and choosing efficiency for program, file and Web bookmark links. The software was designed to showcase a new 3D Chooser technology with the potential to provide an alternative to the Menu and List based retrieval methods.

Typically with Menus, two problems occur. Either the user must scan through each item on a long list, and scanning becomes tedious. Or else the desired item is buried deep inside another Menu level which you cannot find. With Menus, you waste time reading and re-reading irrelevant options.

Menus are not very Lookable because they do not create a sense of place. Items are simply left to float around the screen, and without any fixed locations. Spectasia's 3D shape, on the other hand, has a distinct pattern. Here one place is clearly differentiated from another. The eye can then dart and flit unhindered from one item to another.

With Spectasia, browsing and choosing are typically faster and more efficient activities. These efficiency improvements become particularly evident when the number of choices grows beyond 15–20 items.

== Code ==
Spectasia consists of around 40,000 lines of Java and Java 3D code. The program internally uses XML, DOM and XSLT processing to manage the tree data structures required to render XML and HTML source files into a 3D form in real time.

=== Version ===
The current release version of the Spectasia code base is Spectasia 2009 (code name Artemis) which was released on 23 March 2009.

Spectasia is available in three separate editions, named Home (the Free edition), and also the Professional and Ultimate editions.

=== Security ===
There are no known security issues at present.

=== Speed ===
Spectasia has been developed in Java (JRE) and Java3D, and both technologies have been criticized in the past in terms of their performance. However, user testing has demonstrated Spectasia to be snappy and responsive, taking only 2–5 seconds to launch, and with most operations completing in a fraction of a second.

=== Data types ===
Spectasia allows the user to create up to 100 items (Home), 1000 items (Professional) and 10,000 items (Ultimate Edition).

It is fully compatible with most common data formats; for example, .exe, .app, .txt, pdf, .doc, .png, .bmp, and .jpg.

The user can import his or her own icons into Spectasia in the .png format.

=== Memory ===
Spectasia typically uses a similar amount of computer RAM memory to a modern web browser, around 100–200 MB.

During particularly intensive sessions, running the program for hours and with multiple imports and system refreshes, memory usage has been seen to approach 500 MB, but the problem has a simple remedy in a 2-3 second reboot.

=== Stability ===
Spectasia is very stable and reports of crashes during use are almost non-existent.

On Mac OS X systems it has been noted that on occasion Spectasia fails to launch. No workarounds have been reported other than restarting Spectasia.

Spectasia has an automatic repair and recovery system which copes with any data corruptions and takes the system back to the last valid state.

=== Future upgrades ===
Spectasia is an application which is upgraded periodically.

=== Extensions ===
No plug-ins or data feeds are currently supported.

== User interface ==
Spectasia is a Lookable User Interface and employs a novel set of display elements and controls.

=== The Data Wave ===
Spectasia employs a curvilinear perspective grid, referred to as a "Data Wave", in order to present Item Choices to the user.

Each Wave consists of a number of individual display places which are used to hold Data Items. Each Data Item on the Wave is then represented by an "Icon".

Users are free to create Items, but it is Spectasia that chooses when, where and how to display corresponding Icons on the Wave.

=== Item types ===
Two different Item types can exist on a Wave.

Firstly, a Data Item representing a 'clickable' link to a Data resource – possibly a local Program, File or else a Web Link to an Internet resource.

Secondly a Wave Item which represents another Wave view altogether, which when clicked on brings that Wave's vista into view.

=== The Data Frame ===
Each Wave has an invisible 'Data Frame' which holds all of its Data Items. A Data Frame can be broader than a Wave, which can as a result contain hidden Items that lie outside of the current view. These out-of-view Items are temporarily located either to the left or right hand side of the Wave, and can be scrolled into view as described below.

=== Data magnification ===
The Home edition displays data at a single magnification. The Professional and Ultimate Editions allow the user to Zoom the Data Magnification.

=== Scrolling a Wave ===
To animate or scroll new regions of an extended Wave into view simply click on the left or right hand side of the screen (lower half), whereupon the entire network of Items on that Wave will animate smoothly in the indicated direction.

Clicking closer to the middle of the screen (horizontally) scrolls at a slower speed and for a smaller number of data Items, whilst clicking towards the edge of the screen maximizes both scrolling speed and the number of Items moved.

Scrolling is only enabled in the left / right direction.

=== Scroll Indicators ===
When an extended Data Wave has Items located outside of the current view, then Spectasia indicates this fact with a small Sphere which appears on the left or right hand side of the Wave.

The presence of a Sphere indicates that the Wave can be scrolled in that direction.

=== Item selection ===
Spectasia has two different Item selection modes. Firstly you can left-click over an Item with the mouse, causing it to either "run" or else to "open-up" if it is a Wave.

Secondly, in order to select an Item for deletion or else for a New Icon action, you can right-click over the Item.

=== Wave navigation ===
Selecting a Wave Item causes Spectasia to bring into view another vista, containing all of the Items present on that Wave.

Simply clicking on subsequent "Wave Icons" allows the user to navigate his or her way through the various Waves.

To move back up the Wave structure to a parent Wave simply right-click the mouse anywhere on the Spectasia window whereupon the parent Waves contents will once again be animated into view.

=== Creating items ===
It is easy to create program, file and web links in Spectasia. You can simply drag and drop Items from your desktop into the Spectasia window, whereupon they will be inserted as Data Items into the current Wave's view.

Creating a new Wave is performed by typing a Wave name into the text box on the Status Bar, and then pressing the return key, whereupon Spectasia will create a new Wave Item.

Likewise, Website Links can be created similarly – and here you will enter the website address into the text box. e.g. www.spectasia.com.

=== Browser Integration ===
With some browsers it is possible to simply Drag and Drop a Web Link directly from your Browser Window and into Spectasia.

This action is not supported in all Browsers, but this functionality has been tested successfully on Firefox, Google Chrome and Safari.

Spectasia supports the importing of Browser Bookmarks from a number of common Browsers, including Chrome, Firefox, Safari etc.

=== Other features ===
Spectasia has many other features and we suggest that interested users download and try the software out for themselves.

== Reception ==
Cyral Roger from Softonic said of the Spectasia beta "The 3D board itself is an interesting alternative to the Finder .. it is an original 3D launcher .. showcases items in a 3D view, which proves particularly impressive on big screens."

Spectasia Eos 7.2 has been rated "Good" on Softpedia.

Spectasia is mentioned in Dr Kim Veltman's work.

Spectasia has been featured in an article in Engineering Technology Magazine.

Spectasia has been featured in .Net Magazine.

Spectasia has been featured in MacFormat Magazine.

Spectasia has been reviewed on FreeDownLoadsCenter.com where a reviewer said "The software Spectasia 1.5 provides you with easy access to the items and saves a lot of your time that you had to otherwise spend on the surfing through the menus and folders .. Considering its overall usage, the utility earns a score of 4 rating points primarily owing to its superlative performance." – 8 April 2008.

== Patents ==
Patent applications are pending (or have already been published) in relation to Spectasia.
