= Glue logic =

Custom digital electronics used to interface simple integrated circuits

In electronics, glue logic is the custom logic circuitry used to interface a number of off-the-shelf integrated circuits. This is often achieved using common, inexpensive 7400- or 4000-series components. In more complex cases, a programmable logic device like a CPLD or FPGA might be used. The falling price of programmable logic devices, combined with their reduced size and power consumption compared to discrete components, is making them common even for simple systems. In addition, programmable logic can be used to hide the exact function of a circuit, in order to prevent a product from being cloned or counterfeited.

The software equivalent of glue logic is called glue code.

== Usage ==
Typical functions of glue logic include:

- Simple logic functions.
- Address decoding circuitry used with older processors like the MOS Technology 6502 or Zilog Z80 to divide up the processor's address space into RAM, ROM and I/O. Newer versions of these processors, such as the WDC 65816 or the Zilog eZ80, may add features that enable glueless interfacing to external devices.
- Buffers to protect outputs from overload, or protect sensitive inputs from electrostatic discharge damage.
- Voltage level conversion, e.g., when interfacing one logic family (CMOS) to another (TTL).

== See also ==
- Glue code
- Reverse engineering
