= Starsector =

Upcoming video game

- Developer: Fractal Softworks
- Publisher: Fractal Softworks
- Composer: Stian Stark
- Platforms: Windows, Linux, MacOS
- Release: April 26, 2013 (Early access)
- Genre: Action role-playing game
- Mode: Single-player

Starsector (formerly Starfarer) is an upcoming action role-playing video game developed and published by Fractal Softworks. It has been in early access since 2013. Set in the distant future, the player commands a fleet of spaceships and engages in trade, exploration, and combat in a procedurally generated world.

Reviewers praised the game on release and have continued to do so on every update, calling it a sort of "Mount & Blade: Warband in space". Fractal Softworks have continued to regularly update the game with new ships, weapons, missions and gameplay features.

== Gameplay ==
Starsector is an open world single-player space combat role playing and exploration game, with a semi-procedurally generated map. The player is able to interact with and join one of seven factions or remain as an independent. The game is fully operated only by mouse, outside of combat and usage of hotkeys.

At the start of the game, the player is given the option to choose their portrait and spawns in the world with a small fleet of ships. After an optional series of short tutorial missions, the player is given complete freedom to do whatever they desire. The player can either travel freely through space or select a destination to travel to on the map, with option to utilize autopilot. There are various faction-owned colonies where the player can hire new crew members, purchase ships, and conduct trade. The player is also able to establish their own colonies and manage their own faction.

Standard missions are offered as the player flies through space or goes to colonies. Completing these missions rewards the player with credits, the in-story universal currency for conducting business. The game sports a real-time simulated economy on every colony, with an open market (subject to a tariff of 30 percent in standard mode, or 40 percent in survival) as well as a black market, where one can purchase and sell illegal goods without a tariff. Black market trade also raises suspicion, which results in searches of the players fleet or damaging of reputation with the faction of the colony. Which goods are illegal to sell on the open market vary between factions; for instance, "The Hegemony" bans the purchase and sale of recreational drugs, human organs, AI cores, and heavy weaponry.

All ships in the game are customizable through the "refit" feature, and the player can equip different weapons, perks, and special abilities to every ship. These perks/abilities ("hullmods") have a wide range of different effects, such as improving the ship's travel speed, improving the armor/swivel speed of the ship's weapon mounts, or making the survey of planets cheaper.

Most gainful actions like combat, discovery of celestial objects, or trading profitably, reward the player with experience. When the player gains enough they gain a level and a skill point which they can allocate to a number of skills in preset categories. Along the way to a higher level the player also periodically gains "story points", which can be spent on various extraordinary actions, for example disengaging from an enemy when usually unable to, or taking beneficial actions in story moments via dialogue options.

=== Combat ===
Combat occurs when one fleet intercepts another in space. The game interface then changes and the player is able to take control of a ship directly. The player is also able to give commands to allied computer controlled ships with commands, such as "avoid", "escort", "move to position", "attack" or "full retreat". Different weapons do more damage against different types of targets (shields, hulls, etc.). The game uses tank controls, with the option to change to standard WASD (turning towards your mouse). A ship generates "flux," a fictitious waste product similar to waste heat, when it fires weapons or absorbs damage with its shields. Flux has to be vented into space (either passively or actively) lest the ship experience an "overload," rendering the ship fully nonfunctional for a brief time.

Victory provides the player an opportunity to scavenge the remains of the enemy ships or restore them to add to their fleet. Failure means they may attempt a full retreat. If they fail at the retreat and their fleet is destroyed, the player will not die, but will escape and be given a minuscule fleet in order to start over again.

== Plot ==
The game itself has minimal plot, and the player is involved in very few story moments. The player is instead intended to create their own story. Lead developer Alexander Mosolov has stated that the player is intended to uncover the setting's backstory as they travel throughout the world.

The game takes place in the far future, after humanity developed faster-than-light travel using transport gates, which acted as wormholes. For many years, this method of travel created a golden age for humanity, which took place under a governing political entity known as the Domain. However, exactly 206 years prior to the game's start, all transport gates abruptly ceased to function and humanity was plunged into a dark age where piracy went rampant and splintering factions began to form and exert their influence. This event is referred to as "the collapse". In the sector, a region of space in the Milky Way galaxy where the game takes place, there are various different factions that have taken hold and reached a strategic stalemate, with no faction being able to win. These factions are:

- The Hegemony, a martial state that believe that they are the true successor of the Domain and humanity in the galaxy. In-game, the Hegemony is the largest faction with the most colonies. They mostly use low-tech ships (ships which have mostly ballistic weapons) with heavy armor and inefficient shields.
- The Persean League, a faction which seeks to maintain autonomy while rebelling against what they believe to be the illegitimate martial law enforced by the Hegemony. They mostly use balanced "midline" ships (ships which have both ballistic and energy-based weaponry) and control many markets on various worlds.
- The Tri-Tachyon are the remnants of the Tri-Tachyon corporation, one of the most powerful corporations in the sector before the collapse. They make and sell most of the technology found in game, and use high-tech ships (ships which have mostly energy weapons), that are fast and have powerful shields.
- The Sindrian Diktat, a faction founded after a revolt against the Hegemony. They are considered by the sector at large to be a military dictatorship. They are the sector's largest producer of fuel, and use mostly midline ships.
- The Luddic Church, also known as The Church of Galactic Redemption, is a faction inspired by a martyr named Ludd. They blame technology for the downfall of humanity and seek a return to a simpler time. They use simple, low-tech ships. They are named after the Luddites, an anti-technology group active in Britain in the early 19th century in turn named after Ned Ludd, a legendary British weaver said to have broken two stocking frames after being put out of a job.
- The Luddic Path is an extreme sect of the Luddic church that claim to have a truer interpretation of Ludd's teachings. They believe that only through extreme violence and acts of terror will humanity return to a simpler age. The Luddic Path is hostile to every faction except the Luddic Church and pirates.
- The Pirates are a loose faction of mercenaries, bandits, looters, and terrorists. Bounties are often put on pirates' heads, and collecting said bounties is an in game way to earn money. Pirates are hostile to every faction except the Luddic Path.
- The Independents are a loose group of neutral planets, stations, fleets, traders, mercenaries, and more. Their fleets primarily consist of midline ships. They have no central structure but are more-or-less unified by their lack of affiliation with any major faction.
- The Remnants are a collection of AI-controlled high-tech ships, created by Tri-Tachyon. They are left over from two wars waged between Tri-Tachyon and the Hegemony, nicknamed the AI wars. The faction's continued existence is kept secret by other factions throughout the game, this is partially because the faction cannot be found in the core worlds, a group of planetary systems in the center of the game map, where all other factions exclusively reside. The faction is hostile to all others.
- The Threat are an enigmatic faction of automated ships. They are found only in systems in abyssal hyperspace, around the edges of the map. They use unique ships, and modular "fragment" components and weapons. Despite not being individually intelligent, they exhibit advanced emergent behavior. They are hostile to and seemingly unknown to all factions.
- The Shrouded Dweller is another enigmatic faction found only in abyssal hyperspace, around the edges of the map. They ambush the player fleet by mimicking abyssal lights (a beneficial phenomenon found in the abyss), and attacking when the player tries to interact with them. They use unique red and black shrouded ships. They are possibly extra-dimensional, composed of exotic matter, and in some sense alive. They are hostile to and seemingly unknown to all factions.

== Development ==
Starsector was made entirely by Fractal Softworks, led by indie developer Alexander Mosolov. Mosolov cited Star Control II as a "major" influence on the game's development, as well as Wing Commander: Privateer, Sid Meier's Pirates!, and Solar Winds.

The Alpha Version of Starsector was released on April 29, 2011, with six missions and a tutorial, as well as some basic modding tools. Starsector is written in Java using LWJGL, and has been receiving steady updates for over a decade. As of January 2026 the game contains a series of main story missions and several major gameplay systems; an in-game functional goods economy, planetary colonization, exploration, factional reputations, player and non-player colony raiding and more. Some of these systems are expected to be expanded or improved upon throughout development, for example expanding upon the main story missions. The fact that the game has been in-development since 2013 has also led to a massive user-made mods library, that has further added content to the game.

The game is currently available for Windows, MacOS, and Linux through the game's website. Notably, the game is not currently available on digital distribution platforms like Steam. A release on those platforms is planned in the future, when the game is deemed more "ready" by the developer.

== Reception ==
Since the Alpha version of the game, the game has received critical acclaim, most notably from Rock, Paper, Shotgun, who said in 2012 that the game was "already top-notch stuff". Eurogamer also previewed the game in 2013, saying that "even now there's a lot to relish", while expressing optimism about the game's expansion. That same year, Kotaku recommended it as a successor to Star Control II and The Ur-Quan Masters. Cubed3 previewed the unfinished game in 2017, explaining that Starsector "has a way to go as far as hammering out balance ... which is a massive annoyance to an otherwise promising space sandbox game." Rock Paper Shotgun noted that the game was still unfinished in 2018, but recommended the game as "more than worth the money already".
