= Glue code =

Source code that serves solely to "adapt" different parts of code

In computer programming, glue code is code that allows components to interoperate that otherwise are incompatible. The adapter pattern describes glue code as a software design pattern.

Glue code describes language bindings or foreign function interfaces such as the Java Native Interface (JNI).

Glue code may be written to access existing libraries, map objects to a database using object–relational mapping, or integrate commercial off-the-shelf programs.

Glue code may be written in the same language as the code it is gluing together, or in a separate glue language.

Glue code can be key to rapid prototyping.

== See also ==
- Adapter pattern
- Glue logic
- Lua (programming language)
- Method stub
- Scripting language
- Shell script
- SWIG
- WinGlue
- Wrapper function
- Wrapper library
