= Visual J++ =

Defunct Java implementation

- Paradigms: Multi-paradigm: generic, object-oriented (class-based), imperative
- Developer: Microsoft
- First appeared: October 1, 1996; 30 years ago
- Final release: 6.0 / 1999; 27 years ago
- Typing discipline: Static, strong
- Memory management: Garbage-collected
- Website: msdn.microsoft.com/en-us/library/ms950413.aspx

Influenced by
- Java

Influenced
- Visual J#, C#

Visual J++ is Microsoft's discontinued implementation of Java. Syntax, reserved words (keywords), and formal grammar conventions are the same as Java's. It was introduced in 1996 and discontinued in January 2004, replaced to a certain extent by J# and C#.

The implementation, MSJVM, did not pass Sun Microsystems' compliance tests, leading to a lawsuit from Sun, Java's creator. Microsoft ceased such support for the MSJVM on December 31, 2007 (later Oracle bought Sun, and with it Java and its trademarks). Microsoft however, officially started distributing Java again in 2021 (though not bundled with Windows or its web browsers as before), i.e. their build of Oracle's OpenJDK, which Microsoft plans to support for at least six years, for LTS versions, i.e. to September 2027 for Java 17.

== J++ compared to Sun's Java implementation ==
While J++ conformed to the Java language specification, Microsoft did not implement certain features of the official Sun Java implementation in its Visual J++ product line. Remote Method Invocation (Java RMI) and Java Native Interface (JNI) are such examples.

In addition, J++ implemented other extensions that were not part of Sun's Java implementation. The inclusion of callbacks and delegates for event handling further defined J++ as a completely different language merely based on an already existing design concept.

Furthermore, J++ applications did not conform to the same standardized method of accessing the underlying operating system functions as any other Java application under Sun's Java SDK. In Microsoft's implementation, an underlying framework called J/Direct provided a base mechanism that allowed J++ applications to completely circumvent Java's class libraries and API in accessing the underlying operating system. Due to this short-cut around the original Java framework, J++ applications were more efficient in taking advantage of Win32 API functions than Java applications.

J++ applications using these features could not be run on Sun's Java SDK, but the Kaffe project developed extensions which made it possible to run J++ applications with these features on their open sourced JVM. However, these extensions (implemented by TransVirtual under Microsoft funding) were not widely used, and J++ applications still needed to be compiled on Visual J++ before being able to be run by Kaffe.

Visual J++ supported ActiveX.

=== Example ===
Here are some examples of Visual J++.

Using Windows Forms:

package org.wikipedia.examples;

import com.ms.ui.ActionEvent;
import com.ms.ui.ActionListener;
import com.ms.ui.Button;
import com.ms.ui.Form;

public class SimpleForm {
    public static void main(String[] args) {
        Form form = new Form("Simple Form");
        
        Button button = new Button();
        button.setText("Click Me");
        
        button.addActionListener(new ActionListener() {
            public void actionPerformed(ActionEvent e) {
                form.setText("Button Clicked!");
            }
        });
        form.add(button);

        form.show();
    }
}

Calling ActiveX:

package org.wikipedia.examples;

import com.ms.activeX.ActiveXComponent;
import com.ms.activeX.Variant;

public class Example {
    public static void main(String[] args) {
        try {
            ActiveXComponent ax = new ActiveXComponent("InternetExplorer.Application");
            ax.setProperty("Visible", new Variant(true));
            ax.invoke("Navigate", new Variant("http://www.microsoft.com"));
        } catch (Exception e) {
            e.printStackTrace();
        }
    }
}

Calling the Windows API:

package org.wikipedia.examples;

import com.ms.win32.RegistryKey;
import com.ms.win32.User32;

public class Example {
    public static void main(String[] args) {
        // Spawn a message box
        User32 user32 = new User32();
        user32.MessageBox(0, "Hello from Windows API!", "Visual J++", 0);

        // Read a registry key
        RegistryKey key = new RegistryKey("HKEY_LOCAL_MACHINE\\SOFTWARE\\Microsoft\\Windows\\CurrentVersion");
        String productName = key.getStringValue("ProductName");
        System.out.printf("Product Name: %s%n", productName);
    }
}

== The WFC ==
The Windows Foundation Classes (WFC) encapsulated the Microsoft Win32 platform API and DHTML object models into a unified class library. WFC was primarily designed for creating graphical user interfaces for Java applications on Windows.

== Sun's litigation against Microsoft ==
Sun Microsystems had originally licensed Java to Microsoft but later initiated litigation against Microsoft for trademark violation. Sun's trademark license for usage of the Java brand insists that all implementations be "compatible".

Some observers have remarked that this incompatibility appears to have been a deliberate aim of Microsoft's, in an attempt to at least slow the advance of Sun's Java technology.

The failure of the MSJVM to pass Sun's compliance tests was a large factor in the initial lawsuit. In 2004, this and all other outstanding Sun–Microsoft lawsuits were settled as part of a wide-ranging agreement between Sun and Microsoft. As provided in the settlement, Microsoft could not incorporate into J++ features that Sun introduced into Java in versions beyond the one J++ had (at that date) been mirrored from; it would be frozen at the feature set of Java version 1.1.4. This effectively killed J++, and ended further updates. Microsoft was also forced to agree to cease distribution of the MSJVM; it is no longer available for download.

The terms of the settlement did, however, permit Microsoft to provide security support, allowing further updates to the MSJVM to fix security holes and any other problems relating to security threats. Microsoft ceased such support for the MSJVM on December 31, 2007.

The technology of J++ was eventually recycled, surviving for a while as part of the Microsoft .NET platform and the J# programming language.

== Visual J++ IDE ==
Visual J++ was also the name of the Integrated Development Environment (IDE) for J++ and provided many tools and utilities to help J++ programmers fully leverage the Win32 API.

Visual J++ is no longer available for distribution, but it was part of the Microsoft Visual Studio product line. Visual Studio 6.0 was the last release to include J++.

== Visual J# ==
Visual J# (pronounced "Jay Sharp") is a Microsoft language whose syntax is close to Java, part of the .NET Framework. Visual J# is part of the Microsoft Visual Studio .NET product suite and is designed to help developers and programmers migrate from J++ (or Java) to the .NET Framework.

Microsoft later developed the C# ("C Sharp") language as the primary language for the .NET platform, which was in many ways influenced by Java; subsequently the .NET Framework shares many ideas in common with Java. Much like Java, C# is compiled to a type of bytecode (called CIL), and runs on top of a virtual machine called the Common Language Runtime. .NET Visual Studio 2005 was the last release to include J#.
