= Java OpenAL =

Library for Java programming language

JOAL (Java OpenAL)
- Developer(s): JogAmp Community
- Stable release: 2.6.0 / August 31, 2025; 0 days ago
- Preview release: n/a / tbd
- Operating system: Cross-platform
- Type: API
- License: BSD license
- Website: jogamp.org/joal

Java OpenAL (JOAL) is one of several wrapper libraries that allows Java programmers to access OpenAL. This allows Java programmers to use 3D sound in applications. JOAL is one of the libraries developed by the Sun Microsystems Game Technology Group. JOAL is released under a BSD license, and is available for Microsoft Windows, Mac OS X, and Linux. Like its graphical counterpart, Java OpenGL (JOGL), JOAL was developed using the GlueGen utility, a program that generates Java bindings from C header files. The official site on java.net was deleted in March 2011. The JOAL project, however, is still alive in Jogamp.org JOAL.
