= Java Debug Wire Protocol =

Communication protocol for Java debuggers

In computing, the Java Debug Wire Protocol (JDWP) is a communication protocol which is part of the Java Platform Debugger Architecture. It is used for communication between a debugger and the Java Virtual Machine, which it debugs. It allows to debug processes on a different computer. It can work over a network socket or through shared memory.

The protocol is implemented in the software library libjdwp. It can be activated using the -Xrunjdwp parameter of Java.

Metasploit includes a module for JDWP. It can exploit it using various scripts, which have functions such as injecting a Java class that executes a shell command, returns operating system details or injects an arbitrary class.
