= Microsoft Java Virtual Machine =

Discontinued Java virtual machine

The Microsoft Java Virtual Machine (MSJVM) is a discontinued proprietary Java virtual machine from Microsoft. It was first made available for Internet Explorer 3 so that users could run Java applets when browsing on the World Wide Web. It was the fastest Windows-based implementation of a Java virtual machine for the first two years after its release. Sun Microsystems, the creator of Java, sued Microsoft in October 1997 for incompletely implementing the Java 1.1 standard. It was also named in the United States v. Microsoft Corp. antitrust civil actions, as an implementation of Microsoft's "Embrace, extend, and extinguish" strategy. In 2001, Microsoft settled the lawsuit with Sun and discontinued its Java implementation.

== History ==
=== Performance ===
The Microsoft JVM won the PC Magazine Editor's Choice Awards in 1997 and 1998 for best Java support. In 1998 a new release included the Java Native Interface which supplemented Microsoft's proprietary Raw Native Interface (RNI) and J/Direct. Microsoft claimed to have the fastest Java implementation for Windows, although IBM also made that claim in 1999 and beat the Microsoft and Sun virtual machines in the JavaWorld Volano test.

=== Antitrust trial ===
Microsoft's proprietary extensions to Java were used as evidence in the United States v. Microsoft Corp. antitrust civil actions.

A Memorandum of the United States in Support of Motion for Preliminary Injunction in the case of United States of America vs. Microsoft claimed that Microsoft wanted to kill Java in the marketplace.

In short, Microsoft feared and sought to impede the development of network effects that cross-platform technology like Netscape Navigator and Java might enjoy and use to challenge Microsoft's monopoly. Another internal Microsoft document indicates that the plan was not simply to blunt Java/browser cross-platform momentum, but to destroy the cross-platform threat entirely, with the "Strategic Objective" described as to "Kill cross-platform Java by grow[ing] the polluted Java market."

=== Sun vs. Microsoft ===
In October 1997, Sun Microsystems, the creator of Java, sued Microsoft for incompletely implementing the Java 1.1 standard.

In January 2001, Sun and Microsoft settled the suit. Microsoft paid Sun $20 million and the two agreed to a plan for Microsoft to phase out products that included the older version of Microsoft Java that allegedly infringed on Sun's Java copyrights and trademarks.

- Office XP Developer
- Office 2000 Developer
- Office 2000 Premium Service Release 1
- Microsoft BackOffice Server 2000
- Internet Security and Acceleration Server (ISA) 2000
- Internet Explorer 5.5
- Visual Studio 6 Microsoft Developer Edition
- Windows 98 and Windows Me

The Microsoft Java Virtual Machine was discontinued in 2003 in response to the Sun Microsystems lawsuit. Microsoft continued to offer support until December 31, 2007.

=== Windows XP ===
The initial release of Windows XP in 2001 did not ship with a Java virtual machine, because of the settlement with Sun. The settlement required people who wanted to run Java Applets in Internet Explorer to download and install either the standard Sun Java virtual machine, or to download a copy of the Microsoft Java virtual machine.

Service Pack 1 (SP1) for Windows XP was released on September 9, 2002. It contained post-RTM security fixes and hot-fixes, compatibility updates, optional .NET Framework support, and enabled technologies for new devices such as Tablet PCs. It also included the Microsoft Java virtual machine. On February 3, 2003, Microsoft re-released Service Pack 1 (SP1) as Service Pack 1a (SP1a). This release removed Microsoft's Java virtual machine in compliance with the lawsuit with Sun Microsystems.

== See also ==
- Visual J++
