= Java Native Interface =

Foreign function interface for the Java language

The Java Native Interface (or Native Method Interface) is a foreign function interface designed for non-Java programming frameworks. The JNI enables Java code to call and be called by native code (i.e. any code using the JNIEnv and interfacing through the C application binary interface), native applications (programs specific to a hardware and operating system platform) and libraries written in other languages such as C, C++ and assembly.

Java 22 introduces the Foreign Function and Memory API, which can be seen as the successor to Java Native Interface.

== Objectives ==
JNI allows native methods to allow for applications to make calls outside of the Java platform, e.g. when the standard Java class library does not support platform-specific features or a certain program library. It is also used to modify an existing application (written in another programming language) to be accessible to Java applications. Many standard library classes depend on JNI to provide functionality to the developer and the user, such as file I/O and audio APIs. Only applications and signed applets may invoke JNI.

The JNI framework allows native code to manipulate and consume Java objects. A native method (marked by the keyword native in Java) can create Java objects and inspect and use these objects to perform its tasks. A native method can also inspect and use objects created by Java application code.

An application that relies on JNI loses the platform portability Java offers (a partial workaround is to write a separate implementation of JNI code for each platform and have Java detect the operating system and load the correct one at runtime).

Not only can native code interface with Java, it can also draw on a Java java.awt.Canvas, which is possible with the Java AWT Native Interface, available since J2SE 1.3.

JNI also allows direct access to assembly, without a C bridge. Accessing Java applications from assembly is possible in the same way.

The JNI is the entry point between languages used to begin the JVM startup.

== Mapping types ==
Java types are the default primitive types available on Java, while JVM type signatures are identifiers used by the JVM to identify the type matching on Java, while native types are types defined by the JNI itself to map to native types. For primitives, the following typedefs are provided:

| Java type | Native typedef | Description | JVM type signature | Closest native type |
|---|---|---|---|---|
| boolean | jboolean | unsigned 8 bits | Z | bool |
| byte | jbyte | signed 8 bits | B | char or int8_t |
| char | jchar | unsigned 16 bits | C | char16_t |
| short | jshort | signed 16 bits | S | short or int16_t |
| int | jint | signed 32 bits | I | int or int32_t |
| long | jlong | signed 64 bits | J | long or int64_t |
| float | jfloat | 32 bits | F | float or float32_t |
| double | jdouble | 64 bits | D | double or float64_t |
| void | void | not applicable | V | void |

In addition, the JVM type signature Lfully-qualified-class; refers the class uniquely specified by that name, for example the signature Ljava.lang.String; (Ljava/lang/String; in class files) refers to the class java.lang.String. Prefixing [ to the signature denotes an array of that type; for example, [I refers to int[], and [[I refers to int[][], up to a maximum of 255 dimensions.

These types are interchangeable. One can use jint where you normally use an int, and vice versa, without any typecasting required. However, mapping between Java strings and arrays to native strings and arrays is different; for instance, jstring and char* are not interchangeable types, nor are jintArray and (C/C++) int[].

JNI additionally contains the following declarations for Java reference types in <jni.h>:

#ifdef __cplusplus
class _jobject {};
class _jclass : public _jobject {};
// ...
typedef _jobject *jobject;
typedef _jclass *jclass;
// ...
#else
struct _jobject;
// ...
typedef struct _jobject *jobject;
typedef jobject jclass;
// ...
#endif

Here, all Java reference types are defined as opaque empty types which act as handles to Java objects. These types should not be dereferenced.

| Java type | JNI handle |
|---|---|
| java.lang.Object | jobject |
| java.lang.Class (non-generic) | jclass |
| java.lang.Throwable | jthrowable |
| java.lang.String | jstring |
| T[] (for a type T) | jarray |
| boolean[] | jbooleanArray |
| byte[] | jbyteArray |
| char[] | jcharArray |
| short[] | jshortArray |
| int[] | jintArray |
| long[] | jlongArray |
| float[] | jfloatArray |
| double[] | jdoubleArray |
| java.lang.Object[] | jobjectArray |

Additionally, the following opaque types are used as handles:

| Java class meta-object | JNI handle |
|---|---|
| Class field | jfieldID |
| Class method | jmethodID |

Note however that jfieldID and jmethodID are just opaque handles, and do not correspond to java.lang.reflect.Field/java.lang.reflect.Method.

== Design ==
The communication between native code and Java code is intermediated by the JNI, acting as an ABI.

// jni.h file

struct JNINativeInterface_;
struct JNIEnv_;

#ifdef __cplusplus
typedef JNIEnv_ JNIEnv;
#else
typedef const struct JNINativeInterface_ *JNIEnv;
#endif

JNIEnv is used to access the structure of functions (array of function pointers), and each function being identifiable by a unique pointer. According to the programming language, C or C++, the implementation can be a little different. For example, in C:

// jni.h file

struct JNINativeInterface_ {

    jint (JNICALL *GetVersion) // JNICALL declaration of a pointer to identify the specific function;
       (JNIEnv *env); // Parameter env is a pointer to the JNIEnv pointer, the pointer-to-pointer;

    jclass (JNICALL *DefineClass)
      (JNIEnv *env, const char *name);

    jclass (JNICALL *FindClass)
      (JNIEnv *env, const char *name);

    // Others functions pointers...
}

=== Implementation ===
In the JNI framework, native functions are implemented in separate .c or .cpp files (C++ provides a slightly simpler interface with JNI). When the JVM invokes the function, it passes a JNIEnv*, a jobject, and any Java arguments declared by the Java method. For example, the following converts jstring to a const char*:

extern "C" {

JNIEXPORT void JNICALL Java_ClassName_MethodName (JNIEnv* env, jobject obj, jstring javaString) {
    const char* nativeString = env->GetStringUTFChars(javaString, 0);

    // Do something with the nativeString

    env->ReleaseStringUTFChars(javaString, nativeString);
}

}

The env pointer is a structure that contains the interface to the JVM. It includes all of the functions necessary to interact with the JVM and to work with Java objects. Anything that Java code can do can be done using JNIEnv. The argument obj is a reference to the Java object inside which this native method has been declared.

Native data types can be mapped to/from Java data types. For compound types, such as objects, arrays and strings, the native code must explicitly convert the data by calling methods in the JNIEnv.

A JNI environment pointer (JNIEnv*) is passed as an argument for each native function mapped to a Java method, allowing for interaction with the JNI environment within the native method. This JNI interface pointer can be stored, but remains valid only in the current thread. Other threads must first call AttachCurrentThread() to attach themselves to the VM and obtain a JNI interface pointer. Once attached, a native thread works like a regular Java thread running within a native method. The native thread remains attached to the VM until it calls DetachCurrentThread() to detach itself.

The JNI framework does not provide any automatic garbage collection for non-JVM memory resources allocated by code executing on the native side. Consequently, native code is responsible explicitly releasing all acquired resources.

On Linux and Solaris platforms, if the native code registers itself as a signal handler, it can intercept signals intended for the JVM. A chain of responsibility can be used to allow native code to interoperate with the JVM. On Windows platforms, Structured Exception Handling (SEH) may be employed to wrap native code in SEH try/catch blocks so as to capture machine (CPU/FPU) generated software interrupts (such as null pointer dereferences and divide-by-zero operations), and to handle these situations before the interrupt is propagated back up into the JVM (i.e. Java side code).

The encoding used for the NewStringUTF(), GetStringUTFLength(), GetStringUTFChars(), ReleaseStringUTFChars() and GetStringUTFRegion() functions is "modified UTF-8", which is not valid UTF-8 for all inputs, but a different encoding. The null character (U+0000) and codepoints not on the Basic Multilingual Plane (greater than or equal to U+10000, i.e. those represented as surrogate pairs in UTF-16) are encoded differently in modified UTF-8. Many programs actually use these functions incorrectly and treat the UTF-8 strings returned or passed into the functions as standard UTF-8 strings instead of modified UTF-8 strings. Programs should use the NewString(), GetStringLength(), GetStringChars(), ReleaseStringChars(), GetStringRegion(), GetStringCritical() and ReleaseStringCritical() functions, which use UTF-16LE encoding on little-endian architectures and UTF-16BE on big-endian architectures, and then use a UTF-16 to UTF-8 conversion routine.

For example, the following demonstrates a native implementation of a Java method HelloJNI::sayHello():

#include <stdio.h>
#include <jni.h>

JNIEXPORT void JNICALL Java_HelloJNI_sayHello(JNIEnv* env, jobject obj) {
    printf("Hello from C!\n");
}

Then, in Java, the function is called like so:

public class HelloJNI {
    static {
        // "hello" refers to libhello.so on Linux
        System.loadLibrary("hello"); // System.load() is other way to load a library.
    }

    public native void sayHello();

    public static void main(String[] args) {
        new HelloJNI().sayHello();
    }
}

== Performance ==
JNI incurs considerable overhead and performance loss under certain circumstances:

- Function calls to JNI methods are expensive, especially when repeatedly calling a method.
- Native methods are not inlined by the JVM, nor can the method be JIT compiled, as the method is already compiled.
- A Java array may be copied for access in native code, and later copied back. The cost is linear in the size of the array.
- If the method is passed an object, or needs to make a callback, then the native method will likely be making its own calls to the JVM. Accessing Java fields, methods and types from native code invokes Java reflection. Signatures are specified in strings and queried from the JVM. This is both slow and error-prone.
- Java strings are objects and have length and are encoded. Accessing or creating a string may require an $O(n)$ copy.

== Foreign Function and Memory API ==
Java 22 introduced the Foreign Function and Memory API, located in java.lang.foreign which can be seen as a sort of successor to the Java Native Interface. It has a simpler interface and generally requires less boilerplate than JNI, due to no longer requiring the inclusion of <jni.h> in the foreign library to invoke, and Foreign Function and Memory API abstracts away the usage of the native keyword completely. It supports region-based memory management. The class java.lang.foreign.MemorySegment models a contiguous segment of memory which can lie inside or outside the JVM heap, and a java.lang.foreign.MemorySegment is allocated using a java.lang.foreign.Arena which controls the lifetime of the region of memory backing its allocated segment of memory.

The java.lang.foreign.Arena offers the following arena kinds:

| Arena kind | Factory method | Bounded lifetime | Explicitly closeable | Accessible from multiple threads |
|---|---|---|---|---|
| Global | Arena.global() | No | No | Yes |
| Automatic | Arena.ofAuto() | Yes | No | Yes |
| Confined | Arena.ofConfined() | Yes | Yes | No |
| Shared | Arena.ofShared() | Yes | Yes | Yes |

package org.wikipedia.examples;

import java.lang.foreign.Arena;
import java.lang.foreign.MemorySegment;
import java.lang.foreign.ValueLayout;

public class ForeignMemoryExample {
    public static void main(String[] args) {
        try (Arena arena = Arena.ofConfined()) {
            MemorySegment segment = arena.allocate(5 * Double.BYTES);
            
            for (int i = 0; i < 5; ++i) {
                segment.setAtIndex(ValueLayout.JAVA_DOUBLE, i, i * 1.1);
            }

            for (int i = 0; i < 5; ++i) {
                double value = segment.getAtIndex(ValueLayout.JAVA_DOUBLE, i);
                System.out.printf("Value at index %d: %d%n", i, value);
            }
        }
    }
}

In a sense, Java Foreign Function and Memory API allows for direct memory allocation outside the JVM heap (i.e. the operating system heap), through Arena.allocate() and MemorySegment.allocateNative() which allocate raw memory directly, while Arena.close() and MemorySegment.close() are used to deallocate/release the memory segment, similar to C++'s resource acquisition is initialization semantics.

As a foreign function interface, the classes java.lang.foreign.Linker is offered for accessing between foreign functions from Java (to and from), java.lang.foreign.SymbolLookup for retrieving the address of a symbol in a library, and java.lang.foreign.FunctionDescriptor for modelling a foreign function signature.

package org.wikipedia.examples;

import java.lang.foreign.Arena;
import java.lang.foreign.FunctionDescriptor;
import java.lang.foreign.Linker;
import java.lang.foreign.MemorySegment;
import java.lang.foreign.SymbolLookup;
import java.lang.foreign.ValueLayout;
import java.lang.invoke.MethodHandle;

public class ForeignFunctionExample {
    public static void main(String[] args) throws Throwable {
        Linker linker = Linker.nativeLinker();
        
        SymbolLookup stdlib = linker.defaultLookup();
        
        MethodHandle printf = linker.downcallHandle(
            stdlib.findOrThrow("printf"),
            FunctionDescriptor.of(ValueLayout.JAVA_INT, ValueLayout.ADDRESS)
        );

        MethodHandle strlen = linker.downcallHandle(
            stdlib.findOrThrow("strlen"),
            FunctionDescriptor.of(ValueLayout.JAVA_LONG, ValueLayout.ADDRESS)
        );

        try (Arena arena = Arena.ofConfined()) {
            MemorySegment formatString = arena.allocateUtf8String("Hello, %s!\n");
            MemorySegment argString = arena.allocateUtf8String("World");
            printf.invokeExact(formatString, argString); // prints "Hello, World!"
            long len = (long)strlen.invokeExact(formatString); // len = 5
        }
    }
}

Layouts are modelled by java.lang.foreign.ValueLayout, which consists of:

| Type | Name | Description |
|---|---|---|
| java.lang.foreign.AddressLayout | ADDRESS | An address layout with the same size as size_t |
| java.lang.foreign.AddressLayout | ADDRESS_UNALIGED | An unaligned address layout with the same size as size_t |
| java.lang.foreign.ValueLayout.OfBoolean | JAVA_BOOLEAN | A value layout constant with the same size as a Java boolean |
| java.lang.foreign.ValueLayout.OfByte | JAVA_BYTE | A value layout constant with the same size as a Java byte |
| java.lang.foreign.ValueLayout.OfChar | JAVA_CHAR | A value layout constant with the same size as a Java char |
| java.lang.foreign.ValueLayout.OfChar | JAVA_CHAR_UNALIGNED | An unaligned value layout with the same size as a Java char |
| java.lang.foreign.ValueLayout.OfShort | JAVA_SHORT | A value layout constant with the same size as a Java short |
| java.lang.foreign.ValueLayout.OfShort | JAVA_SHORT_UNALIGNED | An unaligned value layout with the same size as a Java short |
| java.lang.foreign.ValueLayout.OfInt | JAVA_INT | A value layout constant with the same size as a Java int |
| java.lang.foreign.ValueLayout.OfInt | JAVA_INT_UNALIGNED | An unaligned value layout with the same size as a Java int |
| java.lang.foreign.ValueLayout.OfLong | JAVA_LONG | A value layout constant with the same size as a Java long |
| java.lang.foreign.ValueLayout.OfLong | JAVA_LONG_UNALIGNED | An unaligned value layout with the same size as a Java long |
| java.lang.foreign.ValueLayout.OfFloat | JAVA_FLOAT | A value layout constant with the same size as a Java float |
| java.lang.foreign.ValueLayout.OfFloat | JAVA_FLOAT_UNALIGNED | An unaligned value layout with the same size as a Java float |
| java.lang.foreign.ValueLayout.OfDouble | JAVA_DOUBLE | A value layout constant with the same size as a Java double |
| java.lang.foreign.ValueLayout.OfDouble | JAVA_DOUBLE_UNALIGNED | An unaligned value layout with the same size as a Java double |

Primitives receive ValueLayout.JAVA_* layouts when mapped to their native types, while pointer types use ValueLayout.ADDRESS (for instance char*, int** or struct Point*).

Additionally, the constant MemorySegment.NULL (of type java.lang.foreign.MemorySegment) is a zero-length native segment representing a null address (nullptr), equivalent to MemorySegment.ofAddress(0).

Java offers additional methods to express more complicated native types, in particular java.lang.foreign.StructLayout and java.lang.foreign.UnionLayout. For instance, the following native types

struct Point {
    int x;
    long y;
};

union Choice {
    float a;
    int b;
};

receive the following layouts:

import java.lang.foreign.MemoryLayout;
import java.lang.foreign.StructLayout;
import java.lang.foreign.UnionLayout;

StructLayout pointLayout = MemoryLayout.structLayout(
    ValueLayout.JAVA_INT.withName("x"),
    MemoryLayout.paddingLayout(4),
    ValueLayout.JAVA_LONG.withName("y")
};

UnionLayout choiceLayout = MemoryLayout.unionLayout(
    ValueLayout.JAVA_FLOAT.withName("a"),
    ValueLayout.JAVA_INT.withName("b")
);

== Alternatives ==
The Java Runtime Interface was created by Netscape as a precursor.

Microsoft's proprietary implementation of a Java Virtual Machine (Visual J++) had a similar mechanism for calling native code from Java, called the Raw Native Interface (RNI). In addition, it offered a simple way to call existing native code that was not itself aware of Java, such as (but not limited to) the Windows API, (J/Direct). However, following the Sun–Microsoft litigation about this implementation, Visual J++ ceased to be maintained. RNI was simpler to use than JNI, because no management of the Java environment pointer was needed; instead, all Java objects were accessed directly. To facilitate this, a tool was used to generate header files from Java classes. Similarly, J/Direct was easier to use than using the necessary intermediate native library and JNI.

Java Native Access (JNA) is a community-developed library that provides Java programmers easy access to native shared libraries without using JNI. However, this requires the redistribution of the dependent jar library. The tradeoff is between JNI being more complex and JNA being slower, and not built-in like JNI.

Historically, GCC (until GCC 7) offered the GNU Compiler for Java. This compiler offered the Compiled Native Interface (CNI), which allowed direct interoperability between C++ and Java. It provided an API that was heavily based on JNI itself. It claimed several advantages over JNI, as it represented Java classes directly as C++ classes, accomplishing this by generating a translated C++ class and header for each Java class.

Since Java 22, the Foreign Function and Memory API supersedes the JNI, due to its reduced boilerplate and simplified interface.

== See also ==
- C++/CLI
- GIWS (software)
- GlueGen
- Java Access Bridge
- Java Debug Wire Protocol
- Java Native Access
- Java Virtual Machine Tools Interface
- GNU Compiler for Java
- libffi
- Platform Invocation Services
- Symbol table
- SWIG

== Bibliography ==
- Gordon, Rob (March 1998). Essential Jni: Java Native Interface (1st ed.). Prentice Hall. p. 498. ISBN 0-13-679895-0.
- Liang, Sheng (June 20, 1999). Java(TM) Native Interface: Programmer's Guide and Specification (1st ed.). Prentice Hall. p. 320. ISBN 0-201-32577-2.
