= Jakarta EE application =

A Jakarta EE application (formerly also called Java EE or J2EE application) is any deployable unit of Jakarta EE functionality. This can be a single Jakarta EE module or a group of modules packaged into an EAR file along with a Jakarta EE application deployment descriptor. Jakarta EE applications are typically engineered to be distributed across multiple computing tiers.

Enterprise applications can consist of combinations of the following:

- Jakarta Enterprise Beans (EJB) modules (packaged in JAR files);
- Web modules (packaged in WAR files);
- connector modules or resource adapters (packaged in RAR files);
- Session Initiation Protocol (SIP) modules (packaged in SAR files);
- application client modules;
- Additional JAR files containing dependent classes or other components required by the application;

== See also ==
- Enterprise software
