= Classpath =

Classpath is a parameter in the Java Virtual Machine or the Java compiler that specifies the location of user-defined classes and packages. The parameter may be set either on the command-line, or through an environment variable.

== Overview and architecture ==
Similar to the classic dynamic loading behavior, when executing Java programs, the Java Virtual Machine finds and loads classes lazily (it loads the bytecode of a class only when the class is first used). The classpath tells Java where to look in the filesystem for files defining these classes.

The virtual machine searches for and loads classes in this order:

1. bootstrap classes: the classes that are fundamental to the Java Platform (comprising the public classes of the Java Class Library, and the private classes that are necessary for this library to be functional).
2. extension classes: packages that are in the extension directory of the Java Runtime Environment or JDK, jre/lib/ext/
3. user-defined packages and libraries

By default only the packages of the JDK standard API and extension packages are accessible without needing to set where to find them. The path for all user-defined packages and libraries must be set in the command-line (or in the Manifest associated with the Jar file containing the classes).

== Setting the path to execute Java programs ==
=== Supplying as application argument ===
Suppose we have a package called org.mypackage containing the classes:

- HelloWorld (main class)
- SupportClass
- UtilClass

and the files defining this package are stored physically under the directory D:\myprogram (on Windows) or /home/user/myprogram (on Linux).

The file structure looks like this:

Microsoft Windows

D:\myprogram\
      |
      ---> org\  
            |
            ---> mypackage\
                     |
                     ---> HelloWorld.class       
                     ---> SupportClass.class   
                     ---> UtilClass.class     

Linux

/home/user/myprogram/
            |
            ---> org/  
                  |
                  ---> mypackage/
                           |
                           ---> HelloWorld.class       
                           ---> SupportClass.class   
                           ---> UtilClass.class     

When we invoke Java, we specify the name of the application to run: org.mypackage.HelloWorld. However we must also tell Java where to look for the files and directories defining our package. So to launch the program, we use the following command:

Microsoft Windows

 java -classpath D:\myprogram org.mypackage.HelloWorld

Linux

 java -cp /home/user/myprogram org.mypackage.HelloWorld 

where:

- java is the Java runtime launcher, a type of SDK Tool (A command-line tool, such as javac, javadoc, or apt)
- -classpath D:\myprogram sets the path to the packages used in the program (on Linux, -cp /home/user/myprogram) and
- org.mypackage.HelloWorld is the name of the main class

=== Setting the path through an environment variable ===
The environment variable named CLASSPATH may be alternatively used to set the classpath. For the above example, we could also use on Windows:

D:\myprogram>set CLASSPATH=D:\myprogram
D:\myprogram>java org.mypackage.HelloWorld

The rule is that -classpath option, when used to start the java application, overrides the CLASSPATH environment variable. If none are specified, the current working directory is used as classpath. This means that when our working directory is D:\myprogram\ (on Linux, /home/user/myprogram/), we would not need to specify the classpath explicitly. When overriding however, it is advised to include the current folder "." into the classpath in the case when loading classes from current folder is desired.

The same applies not only to java launcher but also to javac, the java compiler.

=== Setting the path of a Jar file ===
If a program uses a supporting library enclosed in a Jar file called supportLib.jar, physically located in the directory D:\myprogram\lib\ and the corresponding physical file structure is:

D:\myprogram\
      |
      ---> lib\
            |
            ---> supportLib.jar
      |
      ---> org\
            |
            ---> mypackage\
                       |
                       ---> HelloWorld.class
                       ---> SupportClass.class
                       ---> UtilClass.class

the following command-line option is needed:

java -classpath D:\myprogram;D:\myprogram\lib\supportLib.jar org.mypackage.HelloWorld

or alternatively:

D:\myprogram>set CLASSPATH=D:\myprogram;D:\myprogram\lib\supportLib.jar
D:\myprogram>java org.mypackage.HelloWorld

=== Adding all JAR files in a directory ===
In Java 6 and higher, one can add all jar-files in a specific directory to the classpath using wildcard notation.

Windows example:

D:\myprogram>java -classpath ".;c:\mylib\*" MyApp

Linux example:

$ java -classpath '.:/mylib/*' MyApp

This works for both -classpath options and environment classpaths.

=== Setting the path in a manifest file ===
If a program has been enclosed in a Jar file called helloWorld.jar, located directly in the directory D:\myprogram, the directory structure is as follows:

D:\myprogram\
      |
      ---> helloWorld.jar 
      |
      ---> lib\  
            |
            ---> supportLib.jar

The manifest file defined in helloWorld.jar has this definition:

Main-Class: org.mypackage.HelloWorld
Class-Path: lib/supportLib.jar

The manifest file should end with either a new line or carriage return.

The program is launched with the following command:

java -jar D:\myprogram\helloWorld.jar [app arguments]

This automatically starts org.mypackage.HelloWorld specified in class Main-Class with the arguments. The user cannot replace this class name using the invocation java -jar. Class-Path describes the location of supportLib.jar relative to the location of the library helloWorld.jar. Neither absolute file path, which is permitted in -classpath parameter on the command line, nor jar-internal paths are supported. This means that if the main class file is contained in a jar, org/mypackage/HelloWorld.class must be a valid path on the root within the jar.

Multiple classpath entries are separated with spaces:

Class-Path: lib/supportLib.jar lib/supportLib2.jar

== OS specific notes ==
Being closely associated with the file system, the command-line Classpath syntax depends on the operating system. For example:

- on all Unix-like operating systems (such as Linux and Mac OS X), the directory structure has a Unix syntax, with separate file paths separated by a colon (":").
- on Windows, the directory structure has a Windows syntax, and each file path must be separated by a semicolon (";").

This does not apply when the Classpath is defined in manifest files, where each file path must be separated by a space (" "), regardless of the operating system.

== See also ==
- Java class loader
- Java Platform Module System
- rpath – Hard-coded search path
