= Constant interface =

In the Java programming language, the constant interface pattern describes the use of an interface solely to define constants, and having classes implement that interface in order to achieve convenient syntactic access to those constants. However, since constants are very often merely an implementation detail, and the interfaces implemented by a class are part of its exported API, this practice amounts to putting implementations details into the API, which was considered inappropriate by, e.g., Java designer Joshua Bloch. In general, collecting system constants into classes independent of behaviour might create a poor object-oriented design because it is often a sign of low cohesion. For these reasons, constant interfaces may be considered an anti-pattern.

Use of this pattern has a few other downsides:

1. It pollutes the class namespace with read-only variables that may not be of use.
2. Contrary to the compile-time tactical utility of implementing a constant interface, the incidental run-time artifacts have little practical purpose (cf. marker interfaces which also have no methods but are useful at run-time).
3. If binary code compatibility is required in future releases, the constant interface must remain forever an interface (it cannot be converted into a class), even though it has not been used as an interface in the conventional sense.
4. Without an IDE that resolves where the constant are coming from, tracking it back to its containing class or interface can be time consuming.
5. An instance of the interface is syntactically no more useful than the interface name itself (since it has no methods).
6. Unless a developer checks any implemented interfaces when adding a constant to a class, or does so but makes a typo in the name of the added constant, the value of a constant can be silently changed. Consider Example 2 below.

Note that the Java libraries use constant interface pattern themselves. For example, the SwingConstants interface was released in 1998, and then it was a reasonable choice.

== Example 1 ==
public interface Constants {

	double PI = 3.14159;
	double PLANCK_CONSTANT = 6.62606896e-34;
}

public class Calculations implements Constants {

	public double getReducedPlanckConstant() {
		return PLANCK_CONSTANT / (2 * PI);
	}
}

== Example 2 ==
public interface Constants {

	public static final int	CONSTANT = 1;
}

public class Class1 implements Constants {

	public static final int CONSTANT = 2;	// *

	public static void main(String args[]) throws Exception {
		System.out.println(CONSTANT);
	}
}

Before the line marked with an asterisk is added, running Class1 prints 1. After adding the line, Class1 prints 2. Both versions compile without warnings or errors.

== Alternatives ==
Many of the pitfalls of the anti-pattern can be avoided by converting the constant interface to a class with static attributes:

public final class Constants {

	private Constants() {
		// restrict instantiation
	}

	public static final double PI = 3.14159;
	public static final double PLANCK_CONSTANT = 6.62606896e-34;
}

Since Java 5, one can use static import to be able to use the constants without the Constants qualifier:

import static Constants.PLANCK_CONSTANT;
import static Constants.PI;

public class Calculations {

	public double getReducedPlanckConstant() {
		return PLANCK_CONSTANT / (2 * PI);
	}
}

The constants can also be imported en masse by using an import static Constants.* statement. This achieves the same goals as using an interface, allowing the constants to be referenced without a qualifier.

To varying degrees, the issues listed above have now been addressed:

1. Because static members can be imported specifically, the class namespace need not be polluted with all members of the constant interface.
2. Run-time and compile-time semantics are more closely aligned when using static imports instead of constant interfaces.
3. The compiled code has one fewer binary compatibility constraint (that "class Calculations implements Constants").
4. Because static imports apply only to the current file (and not the whole class hierarchy) it is easier to discover where each static member is declared.
5. There is less need to declare variables of the constant interface type, and it is potentially clearer that no concrete instance actually exists.

Note, however, that the changes do nothing to improve the cohesion of the Constants class nor prevent the accidental silent modification of the value of a constant, so static imports should not be considered to be a panacea.
