= Java packager =

The Java Packager tool is a tool included in the JDK which allows to package Java applications from the command line. It is an alternative to using other packaging tools like Apache Ant.

Note that the Java Packager does not automatically produce a Jar file. Many other formats are available, including native executable formats for the platform.

The Java Packager tool also manipulates modules (added in Java 9), allowing for example to package a module and all the modules it depends on.

== Example ==
For example, the following command will create a outputJar.jar file with the content of the classesDir directory, and will set the myPackager.MainClass as the executable class of the jar file:

javapackager -createjar -appclass myPackager.MainClass -srcdir classesDir -outdir out -outfile outputJar -v
