= WAR (file format) =

Type of file format

Web ARchive
- Filename extension: .war
- Internet media type: application/java-archive
- Magic number: PK\x03\x04 (standard ZIP file)
- Developed by: Sun; Oracle; Eclipse
- Container for: JSP, Jakarta Servlet
- Extended from: JAR

In software engineering, a WAR file (Web Application Resource or Web application ARchive) is a file used to distribute a collection of JAR-files, Jakarta Server Pages, Jakarta Servlets, Java classes, XML files, tag libraries, static web pages (HTML and related files) and other resources that together constitute a web application.

== Content and structure ==
A WAR file may be digitally signed in the same way as a JAR file in order to allow others to determine where the source code came from.

There are special files and directories within a WAR file:

- The /WEB-INF directory in the WAR file contains a file named web.xml which defines the structure of the web application. If the web application is only serving JSP files, the web.xml file is not strictly necessary. If the web application uses servlets, then the servlet container uses web.xml to ascertain to which servlet a URL request will be routed. The web.xml file is also used to define context variables which can be referenced within the servlets and it is used to define environmental dependencies which the deployer is expected to set up. An example of this is a dependency on a mail session used to send email. The servlet container is responsible for providing this service.

== Advantages of WAR files ==
- Easy testing and deployment of web applications
- Easy identification of the version of the deployed application
- All Jakarta EE containers support WAR files
- MVC structure supports WAR files.

Assuming production environments do not promote a fix without sufficient testing prior to deployment, a WAR file has a distinct advantage when properties files are used to identify environment specific variables. For example, an LDAP server in a testing environment may be something like ldaps://testauth.example.com:636. The LDAP server in a production environment is ldaps://auth.example.com:636. An external properties file would define the link with some thing like:

LINKED_PAGE=ldaps://testauth.example.com:636

The source code reads the property file to determine the target LDAP server. In this way, developers can be certain that the WAR file tested and verified is exactly the same as that which is being promoted to production.

== Disadvantages of WAR files ==
Some consider web deployment using WAR files to be disadvantageous when minor changes to source code are required for dynamic environments. Each change to source code must be repackaged and deployed in development. This does not require stopping the web server if configured for runtime deployment.

== Example ==
The following sample web.xml file demonstrates the declaration and association of a servlet:

<?xml version="1.0" encoding="UTF-8"?>
<!DOCTYPE web-app
    PUBLIC "-//Sun Microsystems, Inc.//DTD Web Application 2.2//EN"
    "http://java.sun.com/j2ee/dtds/web-app_2_2.dtd">

<web-app>
    <servlet>
        <servlet-name>HelloServlet</servlet-name>
        <servlet-class>mypackage.HelloServlet</servlet-class>
    </servlet>

    <servlet-mapping>
        <servlet-name>HelloServlet</servlet-name>
        <url-pattern>/HelloServlet</url-pattern>
    </servlet-mapping>

    <resource-ref>
        <description>
            Resource reference to a factory for javax.mail.Session
            instances that may be used for sending electronic mail messages,
            preconfigured to connect to the appropriate SMTP server.
        </description>
        <res-ref-name>mail/Session</res-ref-name>
        <res-type>javax.mail.Session</res-type>
        <res-auth>Container</res-auth>
    </resource-ref>
</web-app>

The /WEB-INF/classes directory is on the class loader's classpath. (The classpath consists of a list of locations from which .class files can be loaded and executed by the JVM.) The /WEB-INF/classes directory contains the classes associated with the web application itself.

Any JAR files placed in the /WEB-INF/lib directory will also be placed on the class loader's classpath.

== See also ==
- EAR (file format)
- JAR (file format)
