= Zipeg =

Open source free software

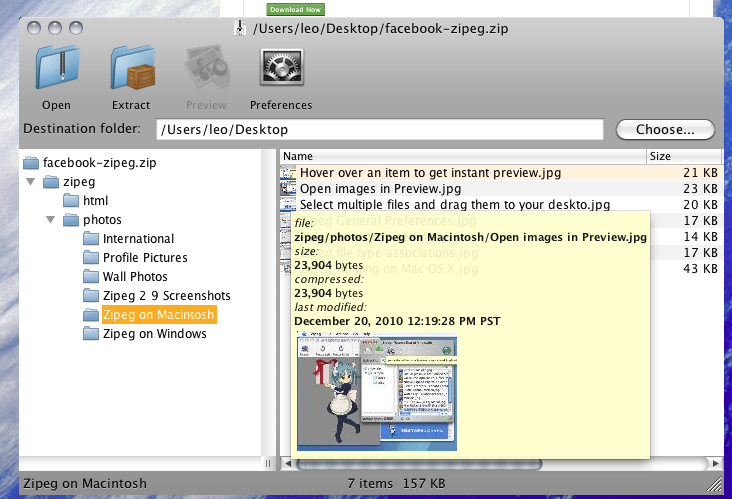
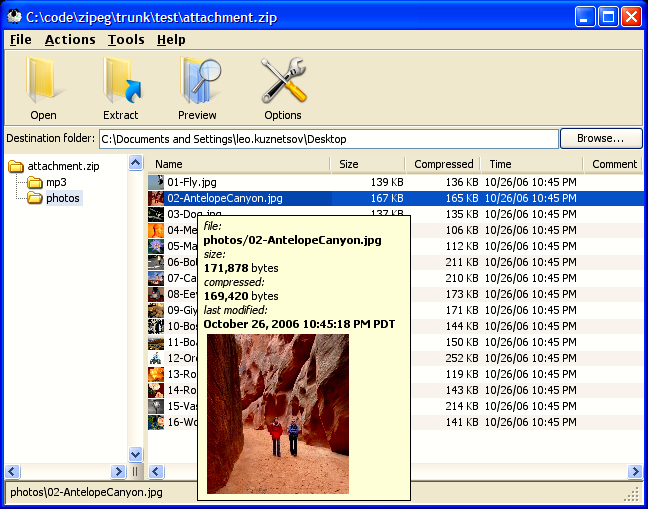
- Zipeg running under Mac OS X and Windows XP
- Developer: Leo Kuznetsov
- Stable release: 2.9.4.1316 / Jul 26, 2012
- Written in: Java
- Operating system: Microsoft Windows, Mac OS X
- Type: File archiver
- License: BSD License
- Website: Main Zipeg Site

Zipeg is an open source free software that extracts files from a wide range of compressed archive formats. Zipeg works under Mac OS X and Windows. It is best known for its file preview ability. It is incapable of compressing files, although it is able to extract compressed ones. Zipeg is built on top of the 7-Zip backend. Its UI is implemented in Java and is open source.

The list of supported archive formats includes: ZIP, 7z, RAR, ARJ, LHA/LZH, TAR, GZ, TGZ, CPIO, BZIP2, RPM, CHM, Z, ISO, CBR, CBZ, EAR and WAR.

Zipeg automatically detects filenames in national alphabets (code pages) and correctly translates them to Unicode. Zipeg reads Exif thumbnails from JPEG digital photographs and uses them for "tool tip" style preview and item icons.

The development has halted since version 2.9.4 from July 2012, the website zipeg.com is no longer available and the source code has also been archived. (Though that happened automatically when Google Code was archived in early 2016.) There is also no recent activity on Leo Kuznetsovs GitHub-Account related to zipeg.

== See also ==
- Zip (file format)
- Data compression
