= Singleton pattern =

Programming technique to restrict a class to a single instance

A class diagram exemplifying the singleton pattern.

In object-oriented programming, the singleton pattern is a software design pattern that restricts the instantiation of a class to a singular instance. It is one of the well-known "Gang of Four" design patterns, which describe how to solve recurring problems in object-oriented software. The pattern is useful when exactly one object is needed to coordinate actions across a system.

More specifically, the singleton pattern allows classes to:

- Ensure they only have one instance
- Provide easy access to that instance
- Control their instantiation (for example, hiding the constructors of a class)

The term comes from the mathematical concept of a singleton.

== Common uses ==
Singletons are often preferred to global variables because they do not pollute the global namespace (or their containing namespace). Additionally, they permit lazy allocation and initialization, whereas global variables in many languages will always consume resources.

The singleton pattern can also be used as a basis for other design patterns, such as the abstract factory, factory method, builder and prototype patterns. Facade objects are also often singletons because only one facade object is required.

Logging is a common real-world use case for singletons, because all objects that wish to log messages require a uniform point of access and conceptually write to a single source.

In Scala, the object keyword essentially defines a singleton object; the compiler creates exactly one instance of this structure, initializes it lazily the first time it is referenced, and makes it globally accessible. Defining a class and object of the same name creates a "companion object", which are Scala's equivalent of Java's static methods (which Scala does not have).

In a dependency injection framework, a singleton is a service lifetime policy where the container creates only one instance of the class and shares that exact instance across the entire application; dependency injection singletons therefore are regular service classes rather than classes with private constructors and a static instance method.

== Implementations ==
Implementations of the singleton pattern ensure that only one instance of the singleton class ever exists and typically provide global access to that instance.

Typically, this is accomplished by:

- Declaring all constructors of the class to be private, which prevents it from being instantiated by other objects
- Providing a static method that returns a reference to the instance

The instance is usually stored as a private static variable; the instance is created when the variable is initialized, at some point before when the static method is first called.

Singletons are typically final, to enforce that only one instance exists by blocking inheritance; however, it may be intentionally not final in cases such as the multiton pattern.

=== Eagerly-instantiated ===
The traditional, eagerly-instantiated implementation, in Java, is as follows:

public final class Singleton {
    private static final Singleton INSTANCE = new Singleton(); // declaration class variable

    private int value;

    private Singleton() {}

    // defines a class operation that lets clients access its unique instance
    public static Singleton instance() {
        return INSTANCE;
    }
    
    public int getValue() {
        return value;
    }
    
    public void setValue(int v) {
        value = v;
    }
}

In C++, the implementation is more intricate; the Java implementation is implicitly thread-safe, but the eager singleton in C++ requires double-checked locking with lock/mutex to guarantee thread safety. Additionally, special member functions must be made either private or deleted to ensure the invariant of only one instance existing is upheld.

import std;

using std::mutex;
using std::scoped_lock;

class Singleton final {
private:
    inline static Singleton* inst = nullptr;
    inline static mutex m; // Mutex for syncrhonized initialization
    int value;
    
    Singleton() = default; // no public constructor
    ~Singleton() = default; // no public destructor
public:
    static Singleton& instance() {
        // First check (for pre-initialization)
        if (!inst) {
            // Lock the mutex before creation
            scoped_lock<mutex> lock(m);
            // Second check uses a lock to prevent race conditions
            if (!inst) {
                inst = new Singleton();
            }
        }
        // After initialization, checks are bypassed entirely
        return *inst;
    }
  
    Singleton(const Singleton&) = delete("Copy construction disabled");
    Singleton& operator=(const Singleton&) = delete("Copy assignment disabled");

    // optional cleanup method; not necessary
    static void reset() {
        scoped_lock<mutex> lock(m);
        delete inst;
        inst = nullptr;
    }

    [[nodiscard]]
    int getValue() const noexcept {
        return value;
    }

    void setValue(int v) noexcept {
        value = v;
    }
};

int main() {
    Singleton::instance().setValue(42);
    std::println("value = {}", Singleton::instance().getValue()); // prints "value = 42"
    Singleton::reset();
}

=== Meyers singleton ===
This is an implementation of the Meyers singleton, so named after Scott Meyers, author of More Effective C++, due to his recommendation of this implementation. This implementation is lazily instantiated, only constructing the instance the first time the execution reaches the definition line inside instance(), never allocating/constructing the object if instance() is never called. This initialization is guaranteed (since C++11) to be thread-safe without needing manual locks, through function-local static initialization. The Meyers singleton does not include a reset() method (unlike the earlier traditional implementation; however, one can be implemented if the singleton is held using a unique pointer), and destruction occurs at program exit (like all static variables). The program output is the same as above.

import std;

class Singleton final {
private:
    Singleton() = default;
    int value;
public:
    // The destructor must be public to allow the runtime to destroy it at program end
    ~Singleton() = default;

    static Singleton& instance() {
        static Singleton instance;
        return instance;
    }
  
    [[nodiscard]]
    int getValue() const noexcept {
        return value;
    }
  
    void setValue(int v) noexcept {
        value = v;
    }
};

int main() {
    Singleton::instance().setValue(42);
    std::println("value = {}", Singleton::instance().getValue()); // prints "value = 42"
}

While the Meyers singleton is mostly unique to C++ due to C++'s function-local static variables with lazy thread-safe initialization, it can still be emulated in other languages. For example, in Java, one can use the initialization-on-demand holder idiom:

public final class Singleton {
    private Singleton() {}

    private static class Holder {
        static final Singleton INSTANCE = new Singleton();
    }

    public static Singleton instance() {
        return Holder.INSTANCE;
    }
}

=== Enum singletons ===
In Java, because enums are full classes (rather than just integral constants), an enum can be used to implement a singleton; any enum E in Java is implicitly final and inherits from java.lang.Enum<E>.

public enum Singleton {
    INSTANCE;

    // fields and methods can be added here
    public void foo() {
        System.out.println("Some singleton operation here");
    }
}

=== Lazy initialization ===
A singleton implementation may use lazy initialization in which the instance is created when the static method is first invoked. In multithreaded programs, this can cause race conditions that result in the creation of multiple instances. The following Java 5+ example is a thread-safe implementation, using lazy initialization with double-checked locking.

public final class Singleton {
    private static volatile Singleton instance = null;

    private Singleton() {}

    public static Singleton instance() {
        if (instance == null) {
            synchronized (Singleton.class) {
                if (instance == null) {
                    instance = new Singleton();
                }
            }
        }
        return instance;
    }
}

In a manner similar to the Meyers singleton, one can use System.Lazy<T> in C# to use lazy initialization:

using System;

public sealed class Singleton
{
    private static readonly Lazy<Singleton> _instance = new(() => new Singleton());

    public static Singleton Instance => _instance.Value;

    private Singleton() {}
}

== Criticism ==
Some consider the singleton to be an anti-pattern that introduces global state into an application, often unnecessarily. This introduces a potential dependency on the singleton by other objects, requiring analysis of implementation details to determine whether a dependency actually exists. This increased coupling can introduce difficulties with unit testing. In turn, this places restrictions on any abstraction that uses the singleton, such as preventing concurrent use of multiple instances.

Singletons also violate the single-responsibility principle because they are responsible for enforcing their own uniqueness along with performing their normal functions.

=== Avoidance through dependency injection ===
Dependency injection can be used to avoid the singleton pattern. The singleton pattern enforces a structural restriction of only one instance of a class, but dependency injection focuses on how dependencies are passed around, avoiding the necessity of objects to look up their own global state.

For example, in the following example, the OrderService is tightly coupled to DatabaseConnection; the database cannot be swapped and a different instance cannot be used.

// a concrete singleton class
final class DatabaseConnection {
    private static DatabaseConnection instance;

    private DatabaseConnection() {
        // database resource initialization
    }

    public static synchronized DatabaseConnection instance() {
        if (instance == null) {
            instance = new DatabaseConnection();
        }
        return instance;
    }

    public void executeQuery(String sql) {
        System.out.printf("Executing: %s%n");
    }
}

// a tightly-coupled consumer class
class OrderService {
    public void placeOrder(String orderId) {
        // hardcoded dependency lookup makes this impossible to unit test
        DatabaseConnection db = DatabaseConnection.instance();
        db.executeQuery(String.format("INSERT INTO orders VALUES ('%s')"));
    }
}

Dependency injection avoids asking how the database is created, or how many instances exist, and only asks for the Database interface in its constructor:

// an abstract interface
interface Database {
    void executeQuery(String sql);
}

// implement the concrete class (no singleton logic)
class SqlDatabase implements Database {
    @Override
    public void executeQuery(String sql) {
        System.out.println("Executing SQL: %s", sql);
    }
}

// the consumer class accepts dependency via constructor injection
class OrderService {
    private final Database db;

    // The dependency is injected from the outside
    public OrderService(Database db) {
        this.db = db;
    }

    public void placeOrder(String orderId) {
        db.executeQuery(String.format("INSERT INTO orders VALUES ('%s')", orderId));
    }
}

== See also ==
- Initialization-on-demand holder idiom
- Multiton pattern
- Dependency injection
- Software design pattern
