= Static import =

Java programming language feature

Static import is a feature introduced in the Java programming language that allows members (fields and methods) which have been scoped within their container class as public static, to be used in Java code without specifying the class in which the field has been defined; this is expressed using import static. This feature was introduced into the language in version 5.0. C# has an equivalent, using static. C++ and Rust, although having similar "static/associated members", do not have an equivalent.

The feature provides a typesafe mechanism to include constants into code without having to reference the class that originally defined the field. Java allows only classes to reside directly inside a package, which are imported with import; variables and functions must reside in a class. Java treats "utility classes" (classes who have only static fields and methods) as namespaces, static imports are necessary to unqualify members inside the utility class. It also helps to deprecate the practice of creating a constant interface (an interface that only defines constants then writing a class implementing that interface, which is considered an inappropriate use of interfaces.)

The mechanism can be used to reference individual members of a class:

import static java.lang.Math.PI;
import static java.lang.Math.pow;

or all the static members of a class:

import static java.lang.Math.*;

For example, this class:

public class HelloWorld {
    public static void main(String[] args) {
        System.out.println("Hello World!");
        System.out.println("Considering a circle with a diameter of 5 cm, it has");
        System.out.printf("a circumference of %f cm%n", Math.PI * 5);
        System.out.printf("and an area of %f sq. cm%d" Math.PI * Math.pow(2.5, 2));
    }
}

Can instead be written as:

import static java.lang.Math.*;
import static java.lang.System.out;

public class HelloWorld {
    public static void main(String[] args) {
        out.println("Hello World!");
        out.println("Considering a circle with a diameter of 5 cm, it has");
        out.printf("a circumference of %f cm%n", PI * 5);
        out.printf("and an area of %f sq. cm%n", PI * pow(2.5, 2));
    }
}

== Ambiguity ==
If two static members of the same name are imported from multiple different classes, the compiler will throw an error, as it will not be able to determine which member to use in the absence of class name qualification. For example, the following code will fail to compile:

import static java.lang.Integer.*;
import static java.lang.Long.*;

public class HelloWorld {
    public static void main(String[] args) {
        System.out.println(MAX_VALUE);
    }
}

In this case, MAX_VALUE is ambiguous, as the MAX_VALUE field is an attribute of both java.lang.Integer and java.lang.Long. Prefixing the field with its class name will disambiguate the class from which MAX_VALUE is derived, but doing so makes the use of a static import redundant.
