= Double-checked locking =

Software design pattern

In software engineering, double-checked locking (also known as "double-checked locking optimization") is a software design pattern used to reduce the overhead of acquiring a lock by testing the locking criterion (the "lock hint") before acquiring the lock. Locking occurs only if the locking criterion check indicates that locking is required.

The original form of the pattern, appearing in Pattern Languages of Program Design 3, has data races, depending on the memory model in use, and it is hard to get right. Some consider it to be an anti-pattern. There are valid forms of the pattern, including the use of the volatile keyword in Java and explicit memory barriers in C++.

The pattern is typically used to reduce locking overhead when implementing "lazy initialization" in a multi-threaded environment, especially as part of the Singleton pattern. Lazy initialization avoids initializing a value until the first time it is accessed.

== Motivation and original pattern ==
Consider, for example, this code segment in the Java programming language:

// Single-threaded version
public class Foo {
    private static Bar bar;

    public Bar bar() {
        if (bar == null) {
            bar = new Bar();
        }
        return bar;
    }

    // other functions and members...
}

The problem is that this does not work when using multiple threads. A lock must be obtained in case two threads call bar() simultaneously. Otherwise, either they may both try to create the object at the same time, or one may wind up getting a reference to an incompletely initialized object.

Synchronizing with a lock can fix this, as is shown in the following example:

// Correct but possibly expensive multithreaded version
public class Foo {
    private Bar bar;

    public synchronized Bar bar() {
        if (bar == null) {
            bar = new Bar();
        }
        return bar;
    }

    // other functions and members...
}

This is correct and will most likely have sufficient performance. However, the first call to bar() will create the object and only the few threads trying to access it during that time need to be synchronized; after that all calls just get a reference to the member variable. Since synchronizing a method could in some extreme cases decrease performance by a factor of 100 or higher, the overhead of acquiring and releasing a lock every time this method is called after the initialization has been completed seems unnecessary. Many programmers, including the authors of the double-checked locking design pattern, have attempted to optimize this situation in the following manner:

1. Check that the variable is initialized (without obtaining the lock). If it is initialized, return it immediately.
2. Obtain the lock.
3. Double-check whether the variable has already been initialized: if another thread acquired the lock first, it may have already done the initialization. If so, return the initialized variable.
4. Otherwise, initialize and return the variable.

// Broken multithreaded version
// original "Double-Checked Locking" idiom
public class Foo {
    private Bar bar;

    public Bar bar() {
        if (bar == null) {
            synchronized (this) {
                if (bar == null) {
                    bar = new Bar();
                }
            }
        }
        return bar;
    }

    // other functions and members...
}

Intuitively, this algorithm is an efficient solution to the problem. But if the pattern is not written carefully, it will have a data race. For example, consider the following sequence of events:

1. Thread A notices that the value is not initialized, so it obtains the lock and begins to initialize the value.
2. Due to the semantics of some programming languages, the code generated by the compiler is allowed to update the shared variable to point to a partially constructed object before A has finished performing the initialization. For example, in Java if a call to a constructor has been inlined then the shared variable may immediately be updated once the storage has been allocated but before the inlined constructor initializes the object.
3. Thread B notices that the shared variable has been initialized (or so it appears), and returns its value. Because thread B believes the value is already initialized, it does not acquire the lock. If B uses the object before all of the initialization done by A is seen by B (either because A has not finished initializing it or because some of the initialized values in the object have not yet percolated to the memory B uses (cache coherence)), the program will likely crash.

Most runtimes have memory barriers or other methods for managing memory visibility across execution units. Without a detailed understanding of the language's behavior in this area, the algorithm is difficult to implement correctly. One of the dangers of using double-checked locking is that even a naive implementation will appear to work most of the time: it is not easy to distinguish between a correct implementation of the technique and one that has subtle problems. Depending on the compiler, the interleaving of threads by the scheduler and the nature of other concurrent system activity, failures resulting from an incorrect implementation of double-checked locking may only occur intermittently. Reproducing the failures can be difficult.

== Usage in C++ ==
For the singleton pattern, double-checked locking is not needed:

If control enters the declaration concurrently while the variable is being initialized, the concurrent execution shall wait for completion of the initialization.

— § 6.7 [stmt.dcl] p4

Singleton& instance() {
    static Singleton s;
    return s;
}

C++11 and beyond also provide a built-in double-checked locking pattern in the form of std::once_flag and std::call_once:

import std;

using std::once_flag;
using std::optional;

class Singleton final {
private:
    Singleton() = default;

    static optional<Singleton> inst;
    static once_flag flag;
public:
    static Singleton* instance() {
        std::call_once(
            Singleton::flag,
            [] -> void { inst.emplace(Singleton()); }
        );
        return &inst;
    }
};

If one wishes to manually implement an explicit and proper double-checked idiom instead of the trivially working example above (for instance because Visual Studio before the 2015 release did not implement the C++11 standard's language about concurrent initialization quoted above), one needs at least atomic operations with acquire/release memory ordering as in this code (explicit memory fence statements also work but may use slower CPU instructions e.g. on ARM64):

import std;

using std::atomic;
using std::lock_guard;
using std::memory_order;
using std::mutex;

class Singleton final {
private:
    Singleton() = default;

    static atomic<Singleton*> inst;
    static mutex m;
public:
    static Singleton* instance() {
        Singleton* s = inst.load(memory_order::acquire);
        // First check
        if (!s) {
            lock_guard<mutex> lock(m);
            s = inst.load(memory_order::relaxed);
            // Second (double) check
            if (!s) {
                s = new Singleton();
                inst.store(s, memory_order::release);
            }
        }
        return s;
    }

    ~Singleton() {
        // cleanup logic
    }
};

== Usage in POSIX ==
pthread_once() must be used to initialize library (or sub-module) code when its API does not have a dedicated initialization procedure required to be called in single-threaded mode.

== Usage in Go ==
package main

import "sync"

var arrOnce sync.Once
var arr []int

// getArr retrieves arr, lazily initializing on first call. Double-checked
// locking is implemented with the sync.Once library function. The first
// goroutine to win the race to call Do() will initialize the array, while
// others will block until Do() has completed. After Do has run, only a
// single atomic comparison will be required to get the array.
func getArr() []int {
	arrOnce.Do(func() {
		arr = []int{0, 1, 2}
	})
	return arr
}

func main() {
	// thanks to double-checked locking, two goroutines attempting to getArr()
	// will not cause double-initialization
	go getArr()
	go getArr()
}

== Usage in Java ==
As of J2SE 5.0, the volatile keyword is defined to create a memory barrier. This allows a solution that ensures that multiple threads handle the singleton instance correctly. This new idiom is described in and .

// Works with acquire/release semantics for volatile in Java 1.5 and later
// Broken under Java 1.4 and earlier semantics for volatile
public class Foo {
    private volatile Bar bar;

    public Bar bar() {
        Bar local = bar;
        if (local == null) {
            synchronized (this) {
                local = bar;
                if (local == null) {
                    bar = local = new Bar();
                }
            }
        }
        return local;
    }

    // other functions and members...
}

Note the local variable local, which seems unnecessary. The effect of this is that in cases where bar is already initialized (i.e., most of the time), the volatile field is only accessed once (due to return local;" instead of return bar;), which can improve the method's overall performance by as much as 40 percent.

Java 9 introduced the java.lang.invoke.VarHandle class, which allows use of relaxed atomics to access fields, giving somewhat faster reads on machines with weak memory models, at the cost of more difficult mechanics and loss of sequential consistency (field accesses no longer participate in the synchronization order, the global order of accesses to volatile fields).

import java.lang.invoke.MethodHandles;
import java.lang.invoke.VarHandle;

// Works with acquire/release semantics for VarHandles introduced in Java 9
public class Foo {
    private volatile Bar bar;
    private static final VarHandle BAR;

    private Bar getBarAcquire() {
        return (Bar) BAR.getAcquire(this);
    }
    private void setBarRelease(Bar value) {
        BAR.setRelease(this, value);
    }

    static {
        try {
            MethodHandles.Lookup lookup = MethodHandles.lookup();
            BAR = lookup.findVarHandle(Foo.class, "bar", Bar.class);
        } catch (ReflectiveOperationException e) {
            throw new ExceptionInInitializerError(e);
        }
    }

    public Bar bar() {
        Bar local = barAcquire();
        if (local == null) {
            synchronized (this) {
                local = getBarAcquire();
                if (local == null) {
                    local = new Bar();
                    setBarRelease(local);
                }
            }
        }
        return local;
    }

    // other functions and members...
}

If the helper object is static (one per class loader), an alternative is the initialization-on-demand holder idiom (See Listing 16.6 from the previously cited text.)

// Correct lazy initialization in Java
public class Foo {
    private static class Holder {
       public static final Bar INSTANCE = new Bar();
    }

    public static Bar bar() {
        return Holder.INSTANCE;
    }
}

This relies on the fact that nested classes are not loaded until they are referenced.

Semantics of final fields in Java 5 can be employed to safely publish the helper object without using volatile:

class FinalWrapper<T> {
    public final T value;

    public FinalWrapper(T value) {
        this.value = value;
    }
}

public class Foo {
   private FinalWrapper<Bar> bar;

   public Bar bar() {
      FinalWrapper<Bar> temp = bar;

      if (temp == null) {
          synchronized (this) {
              if (bar == null) {
                  bar = new FinalWrapper<>(new Bar());
              }
              temp = bar;
          }
      }
      return temp.value;
   }
}

The local variable temp is required for correctness: simply using bar for both null checks and the return statement could fail due to read reordering allowed under the Java Memory Model. Performance of this implementation is not necessarily better than the volatile implementation.

== Usage in C# ==
In .NET Framework 4.0, the System.Lazy<T> class was introduced, which internally uses double-checked locking by default (LazyThreadSafetyMode.ExecutionAndPublication mode) to store either the exception that was thrown during construction, or the result of the function that was passed to System.Lazy<T>:

using System;

public class MySingleton
{
    private static readonly Lazy<MySingleton> _mySingleton = new(() => new MySingleton());

    private MySingleton() { }

    public static MySingleton Instance => _mySingleton.Value;
}

== See also ==
- The Test and Test-and-set idiom for a low-level locking mechanism.
- Initialization-on-demand holder idiom for a thread-safe replacement in Java.
