= Lazy initialization =

Delay of a task until it is first needed

In computer programming, lazy initialization is the tactic of delaying the creation of an object, the calculation of a value, or some other expensive process until the first time it is needed. It is a kind of lazy evaluation that refers specifically to the instantiation of objects or other resources.

This is typically accomplished by augmenting an accessor method (or property getter) to check whether a private member, acting as a cache, has already been initialized. If it has, it is returned straight away. If not, a new instance is created, placed into the member variable, and returned to the caller just-in-time for its first use.

If objects have properties that are rarely used, this can improve startup speed. Mean average program performance may be slightly worse in terms of memory (for the condition variables) and execution cycles (to check them), but the impact of object instantiation is spread in time ("amortized") rather than concentrated in the startup phase of a system, and thus median response times can be greatly improved.

In multithreaded code, access to lazy-initialized objects/state must be synchronized to guard against race conditions.

== The "lazy factory" ==
In a software design pattern view, lazy initialization is often used together with a factory method pattern. This combines three ideas:

- Using a factory method to create instances of a class (factory method pattern)
- Storing the instances in a map, and returning the same instance to each request for an instance with same parameters (multiton pattern)
- Using lazy initialization to instantiate the object the first time it is requested (lazy initialization pattern)

== Examples ==
=== ActionScript 3 ===
The following is an example of a class with lazy initialization implemented in ActionScript:

package org.wikipedia.examples
{
	public class Fruit 
	{
		private var _typeName: String;
		private static var instancesByTypeName: Dictionary = new Dictionary();
	 
		public function Fruit(typeName: String): void
		{
			this._typeName = typeName;
		}
		
		public function get typeName(): String
		{
			return _typeName;
		}
	 
		public static function getFruitByTypeName(typeName: String): Fruit
		{
			return instancesByTypeName[typeName] ||= new Fruit(typeName);
		}
	 
		public static function printCurrentTypes(): void
		{
			for each (var fruit: Fruit in instancesByTypeName) 
			{
				// iterates through each value
				trace(fruit.typeName);
			}
		}
	}
}

Basic use:

package
{
	import org.wikipedia.examples;
	
	public class Main 
	{
		public function Main(): void
		{
			Fruit.getFruitByTypeName("Banana");
			Fruit.printCurrentTypes();
	 
			Fruit.getFruitByTypeName("Apple");
			Fruit.printCurrentTypes();
	 
			Fruit.getFruitByTypeName("Banana");
			Fruit.printCurrentTypes();
		}
	}
}

=== C ===
In C, lazy evaluation would normally be implemented inside one function, or one source file, using static variables.

In a function:

#include <stddef.h>
#include <stdlib.h>
#include <stdio.h>
#include <string.h>

typedef struct Fruit {
    char* name;
    struct Fruit* next;
    int number;
    // Other members
} Fruit;

Fruit* getFruit(char* name) {
    static Fruit* fruitList;
    static int seq;
    Fruit* f = fruitList;

    while (f) {
        if (!strcmp(name, f->name)) {
            return f;
        }
        f = f->next;
    }

    if (!(f = malloc(sizeof(Fruit)))) {
        return NULL;
    }

    if (!(f->name = strdup(name))) {
        free(f);
        return NULL;
    }

    f->number = ++seq;
    f->next = fruitList;
    fruitList = f;
    return f;
}

// Example code

int main(int argc, char* argv[]) {
    Fruit* f;

    if (argc < 2) {
        fprintf(stderr, "Usage: fruits fruit-name [...]\n");
        return 1;
    }

    for (int i = 1; i < argc; i++) {
        if (f = getFruit(argv[i])) {
            printf("Fruit %s: number %d\n", argv[i], f->number);
        }
    }

    return 0;
}

Using one source file instead allows the state to be shared between multiple functions, while still hiding it from non-related functions.

Fruit.h:

#pragma once

typedef struct Fruit {
    char* name;
    struct Fruit* next;
    int number;
    // Other members
} Fruit;

Fruit* getFruit(char* name);
void printFruitList(FILE* file);

Fruit.c:

#include <stddef.h>
#include <stdlib.h>
#include <stdio.h>
#include <string.h>

#include "Fruit.h"

static Fruit* fruitList;
static int seq;

struct Fruit* getFruit(char* name) {
    Fruit* f = fruitList;

    while (f) {
        if (!strcmp(name, f->name)) {
            return f;
        }
        f = f->next;
    }

    if (!(f = malloc(sizeof(Fruit)))) {
        return NULL;
    }

    if (!(f->name = strdup(name))) {
        free(f);
        return NULL;
    }

    f->number = ++seq;
    f->next = fruitList;
    fruitList = f;
    return f;
}

void printFruitList(FILE* file) {
    Fruit* f = fruitList;
    while (f) {
        fprintf(file, "%4d  %s\n", f->number, f->name);
        f = f->next;
    }
}

Main.c:

#include <stdlib.h>
#include <stdio.h>

#include "Fruit.h"

int main(int argc, char* argv[]) {
    Fruit* f;

    if (argc < 2) {
        fprintf(stderr, "Usage: fruits fruit-name [...]\n");
        return 1;
    }

    for (int i = 1; i < argc; i++) {
        if (f = getFruit(argv[i])) {
            printf("Fruit %s: number %d\n", argv[i], f->number);
        }
    }

    printf("The following fruits have been generated:\n");
    printFruitList(stdout);
    return 0;
}

=== C# ===
In .NET Framework 4.0 Microsoft has included a System.Lazy class that can be used to do lazy loading. Below is some dummy code that does lazy loading of Class Fruit

using System;

Lazy<Fruit> lazyFruit = new();
Fruit fruit = lazyFruit.Value;

Here is a dummy example in C#.

The Fruit class itself doesn't do anything here, The class variable _typesDictionary is a Dictionary/Map used to store Fruit instances by typeName.

namespace Wikipedia.Examples;

using System;
using System.Collections;
using System.Collections.Generic;

class Fruit
{
    private string _typeName;
    private static IDictionary<string, Fruit> _typesDictionary = new Dictionary<string, Fruit>();

    private Fruit(string typeName)
    {
        this._typeName = typeName;
    }

    public static Fruit GetFruitByTypeName(string type)
    {
        Fruit fruit;

        if (!_typesDictionary.TryGetValue(type, out fruit))
        {
            // Lazy initialization
            fruit = new(type);

            _typesDictionary.Add(type, fruit);
        }

        return fruit;
    }

    public static void ShowAll()
    {
        if (_typesDictionary.Count > 0)
        {
            Console.WriteLine($"Number of instances made = {_typesDictionary.Count}");
            
            foreach (KeyValuePair<string, Fruit> kvp in _typesDictionary)
            {
                Console.WriteLine(kvp.Key);
            }
            
            Console.WriteLine();
        }
    }
    
    public Fruit()
    {
        // required so the sample compiles
    }
}

public class Program
{
    static void Main(string[] args)
    {
        Fruit.GetFruitByTypeName("Banana");
        Fruit.ShowAll();

        Fruit.GetFruitByTypeName("Apple");
        Fruit.ShowAll();

        // returns pre-existing instance from first 
        // time Fruit with "Banana" was created
        Fruit.GetFruitByTypeName("Banana");
        Fruit.ShowAll();

        Console.ReadLine();
    }
}

A fairly straightforward 'fill-in-the-blanks' example of a Lazy Initialization design pattern, except that this uses an enumeration for the type

namespace Wikipedia.Examples;

using System;
using System.Collections.Generic;

public class LazyFactoryObject
{
    // internal collection of items
    // IDictionary makes sure they are unique
    private IDictionary<LazyObjectSize, LazyObject> _LazyObjectList =
        new Dictionary<LazyObjectSize, LazyObject>();

    // enum for passing name of size required
    // avoids passing strings and is part of LazyObject ahead
    public enum LazyObjectSize
    {
        None,
        Small,
        Big,
        Bigger,
        Huge
    }

    // standard type of object that will be constructed
    public struct LazyObject
    {
        public LazyObjectSize Size;
        public IList<int> Result;
    }

    // takes size and create 'expensive' list
    private IList<int> Result(LazyObjectSize size)
    {
        IList<int> result = null;

        switch (size)
        {
            case LazyObjectSize.Small:
                result = CreateSomeExpensiveList(1, 100);
                break;
            case LazyObjectSize.Big:
                result = CreateSomeExpensiveList(1, 1000);
                break;
            case LazyObjectSize.Bigger:
                result = CreateSomeExpensiveList(1, 10000);
                break;
            case LazyObjectSize.Huge:
                result = CreateSomeExpensiveList(1, 100000);
                break;
            case LazyObjectSize.None:
                result = null;
                break;
        }

        return result;
    }

    // not an expensive item to create, but you get the point
    // delays creation of some expensive object until needed
    private IList<int> CreateSomeExpensiveList(int start, int end)
    {
        IList<int> result = new List<int>();

        for (int counter = 0; counter < (end - start); counter++)
        {
            result.Add(start + counter);
        }

        return result;
    }

    public LazyFactoryObject()
    {
        // empty constructor
    }

    public LazyObject GetLazyFactoryObject(LazyObjectSize size)
    {
        // yes, i know it is illiterate and inaccurate
        LazyObject noGoodSomeOne;

        // retrieves LazyObjectSize from list via out, else creates one and adds it to list
        if (!_LazyObjectList.TryGetValue(size, out noGoodSomeOne))
        {
            noGoodSomeOne = new LazyObject();
            noGoodSomeOne.Size = size;
            noGoodSomeOne.Result = this.Result(size);

            _LazyObjectList.Add(size, noGoodSomeOne);
        }

        return noGoodSomeOne;
    }
}

=== C++ ===
This example is in C++.

import std;

template <typename K, typename V>
using HashMap = std::unordered_map<K, V>;
template <typename T>
using SharedPtr = std::shared_ptr<T>;
using String = std::string;

class Fruit {
private:
    static HashMap<String, SharedPtr<Fruit>> types = {};
    String type;

    // Note: constructor private forcing one to use static getFruit.
    explicit Fruit(const String& type): 
        type{type} {}
public:
    // Lazy Factory method, gets the Fruit instance associated with a certain type.
    // Creates new ones as needed.
    static SharedPtr<Fruit> getFruit(const String& type) {
        auto [it, inserted] = types.emplace(type, nullptr);
        if (inserted) {
            it->second = std::make_shared<Fruit>(type);
        }
        return it->second;
    }

    // For example purposes to see pattern in action.
    static void printCurrentTypes() {
        std::println("Number of instances made = {}", types.size());
        for (const auto& [type, fruit] : types) {
            std::println({}, type);
        }
        std::println();
    }
};

int main(int argc, char* argv[]) {
    Fruit::getFruit("Banana");
    Fruit::printCurrentTypes();

    Fruit::getFruit("Apple");
    Fruit::printCurrentTypes();

    // Returns pre-existing instance from first time Fruit with "Banana" was
    // created.
    Fruit::getFruit("Banana");
    Fruit::printCurrentTypes();
}

// OUTPUT:
//
// Number of instances made = 1
// Banana
//
// Number of instances made = 2
// Apple
// Banana
//
// Number of instances made = 2
// Apple
// Banana
//

=== Crystal ===
class Fruit
  private getter type : String
  @@types = {} of String => Fruit

  def initialize(@type)
  end

  def self.get_fruit_by_type(type : String)
    @@types[type] ||= Fruit.new(type)
  end

  def self.show_all
    puts "Number of instances made: #{@@types.size}"
    @@types.each do |type, fruit|
      puts "#{type}"
    end
    puts
  end

  def self.size
    @@types.size
  end
end

Fruit.get_fruit_by_type("Banana")
Fruit.show_all

Fruit.get_fruit_by_type("Apple")
Fruit.show_all

Fruit.get_fruit_by_type("Banana")
Fruit.show_all

Output:

Number of instances made: 1
Banana

Number of instances made: 2
Banana
Apple

Number of instances made: 2
Banana
Apple

=== Haxe ===
This example is in Haxe.

class Fruit {
  private static var _instances = new Map<String, Fruit>();

  public var name(default, null):String;

  public function new(name:String) {
    this.name = name;
  }

  public static function getFruitByName(name:String):Fruit {
    if (!_instances.exists(name)) {
      _instances.set(name, new Fruit(name));
    }
    return _instances.get(name);
  }

  public static function printAllTypes() {
    trace([for(key in _instances.keys()) key]);
  }
}

Usage

class Test {
  public static function main () {
    var banana = Fruit.getFruitByName("Banana");
    var apple = Fruit.getFruitByName("Apple");
    var banana2 = Fruit.getFruitByName("Banana");
    
    trace(banana == banana2); // true. same banana
    
    Fruit.printAllTypes(); // ["Banana","Apple"]
  }
}

=== Java ===
This example is in Java.

package org.wikipedia.examples;

import java.util.HashMap;
import java.util.Map;

enum FruitType {
    NONE,
    APPLE,
    BANANA,
}

class Fruit {
    private static Map<FruitType, Fruit> types = new HashMap<>();
    
    /**
     * Using a private constructor to force the use of the factory method.
     * @param type
     */
    private Fruit(FruitType type) {

    }
    
    /**
     * Lazy Factory method, gets the Fruit instance associated with a certain
     * type. Instantiates new ones as needed.
     * @param type Any allowed fruit type, e.g. APPLE
     * @return The Fruit instance associated with that type.
     */
    public static Fruit getFruitByTypeName(FruitType type) {
        Fruit fruit;
        // This has concurrency issues.  Here the read to types is not synchronized, 
        // so types.put and types.containsKey might be called at the same time.
        // Don't be surprised if the data is corrupted.
        if (!types.containsKey(type)) {
            // Lazy initialisation
            fruit = new Fruit(type);
            types.put(type, fruit);
        } else {
            // OK, it's available currently
            fruit = types.get(type);
        }
        
        return fruit;
    }
    
    /**
     * Lazy Factory method, gets the Fruit instance associated with a certain
     * type. Instantiates new ones as needed. Uses double-checked locking 
     * pattern for using in highly concurrent environments.
     * @param type Any allowed fruit type, e.g. APPLE
     * @return The Fruit instance associated with that type.
     */
    public static Fruit getFruitByTypeNameHighConcurrentVersion(FruitType type) {
        if (!types.containsKey(type)) {
            synchronized (types) {
                // Check again, after having acquired the lock to make sure
                // the instance was not created meanwhile by another thread
                if (!types.containsKey(type)) {
                    // Lazy initialisation
                    types.put(type, new Fruit(type));
                }
            }
        }
        
        return types.get(type);
    }
    
    /**
     * Displays all entered fruits.
     */
    public static void showAll() {
        if (types.size() > 0) {
 
           System.out.printf("Number of instances made = %d%n", types.size());
            
            for (Map.Entry<FruitType, Fruit> entry : types.entrySet()) {
                String fruit = entry.getKey().toString();
                fruit = Character.toUpperCase(fruit.charAt(0)) + fruit.substring(1);
                System.out.println(fruit);
            }
            
            System.out.println();
        }
    }
}

public class Program {

    /**
     * @param args
     */
    public static void main(String[] args) {
        Fruit.getFruitByTypeName(FruitType.BANANA);
        Fruit.showAll();
        Fruit.getFruitByTypeName(FruitType.APPLE);
        Fruit.showAll();
        Fruit.getFruitByTypeName(FruitType.BANANA);
        Fruit.showAll();
    }
}

Output

Number of instances made = 1
Banana

Number of instances made = 2
Banana
Apple

Number of instances made = 2
Banana
Apple

=== JavaScript ===
This example is in JavaScript.

var Fruit = (function() {
  var types = {};
  function Fruit() {};

  // count own properties in object
  function count(obj) {
    return Object.keys(obj).length;
  }

  var _static = {
    getFruit: function(type) {
      if (typeof types[type] == 'undefined') {
        types[type] = new Fruit;
      }
      return types[type];
    },
    printCurrentTypes: function () {
      console.log('Number of instances made: ' + count(types));
      for (var type in types) {
        console.log(type);
      }
    }
  };

  return _static;

})();

Fruit.getFruit('Apple');
Fruit.printCurrentTypes();
Fruit.getFruit('Banana');
Fruit.printCurrentTypes();
Fruit.getFruit('Apple');
Fruit.printCurrentTypes();

Output

Number of instances made: 1
Apple

Number of instances made: 2
Apple
Banana

Number of instances made: 2
Apple
Banana

=== PHP ===
Here is an example of lazy initialization in PHP 7.4:

<?php
header('Content-Type: text/plain; charset=utf-8');

class Fruit
{
    private string $type;
    private static array $types = array();

    private function __construct(string $type)
    {
        $this->type = $type;
    }

    public static function getFruit(string $type): Fruit
    {
        // Lazy initialization takes place here
        if (!isset(self::$types[$type])) {
            self::$types[$type] = new Fruit($type);
        }

        return self::$types[$type];
    }

    public static function printCurrentTypes(): void
    {
        echo 'Number of instances made: ' . count(self::$types) . "\n";
        foreach (array_keys(self::$types) as $key) {
            echo "$key\n";
        }
        echo "\n";
    }
}

Fruit::getFruit('Apple');
Fruit::printCurrentTypes();

Fruit::getFruit('Banana');
Fruit::printCurrentTypes();

Fruit::getFruit('Apple');
Fruit::printCurrentTypes();

/*
OUTPUT:

Number of instances made: 1
Apple

Number of instances made: 2
Apple
Banana

Number of instances made: 2
Apple
Banana
*/

=== Python ===
This example is in Python.

class Fruit:
    def __init__(self, item: str) -> None:
        self.item = item
    
class FruitCollection:
    def __init__(self) -> None:
        self.items: dict[str, Fruit] = {}
    
    def get_fruit(self, item: str) -> Fruit:
        if item not in self.items:
            self.items[item] = Fruit(item)
        
        return self.items[item]

if __name__ == "__main__":
    fruits: FruitCollection = FruitCollection()
    print(fruits.get_fruit("Apple"))
    print(fruits.get_fruit("Lime"))

=== Ruby ===
This example is in Ruby, of lazily initializing an authentication token from a remote service like Google. The way that @auth_token is cached is also an example of memoization.

require 'net/http'
class Blogger
  def auth_token
    @auth_token ||=
      (res = Net::HTTP.post_form(uri, params)) &&
      get_token_from_http_response(res)
  end

  # get_token_from_http_response, uri and params are defined later in the class
end

b = Blogger.new
b.instance_variable_get(:@auth_token) # returns nil
b.auth_token # returns token
b.instance_variable_get(:@auth_token) # returns token

=== Rust ===
Rust have std::cell::LazyCell.

use std::cell::LazyCell;

let lazy: LazyCell = LazyCell::new(|| 42);

=== Scala ===
Scala has built-in support for lazy variable initiation.

 scala> val x = { println("Hello"); 99 }
 Hello
 x: Int = 99
 scala> lazy val y = { println("Hello!!"); 31 }
 y: Int = <lazy>
 scala> y
 Hello!!
 res2: Int = 31
 scala> y
 res3: Int = 31

=== Smalltalk ===
This example is in Smalltalk, of a typical accessor method to return the value of a variable using lazy initialization.

    height
        ^height ifNil: [height := 2.0].

The 'non-lazy' alternative is to use an initialization method that is run when the object is created and then use a simpler accessor method to fetch the value.

    initialize
        height := 2.0

    height
        ^height

Note that lazy initialization can also be used in non-object-oriented languages.

== Theoretical computer science ==
In the field of theoretical computer science, lazy initialization (also called a lazy array) is a technique to design data structures that can work with memory that does not need to be initialized. Specifically, assume that we have access to a table T of n uninitialized memory cells (numbered from 1 to n), and want to assign m cells of this array, e.g., we want to assign T[k_{i}] := v_{i} for pairs (k_{1}, v_{1}), ..., (k_{m}, v_{m}) with all k_{i} being different. The lazy initialization technique allows us to do this in just O(m) operations, rather than spending O(m+n) operations to first initialize all array cells. The technique is simply to allocate a table V storing the pairs (k_{i}, v_{i}) in some arbitrary order, and to write for each i in the cell T[k_{i}] the position in V where key k_{i} is stored, leaving the other cells of T uninitialized. This can be used to handle queries in the following fashion: when we look up cell T[k] for some k, we can check if T[k] is in the range {1, ..., m}: if it is not, then T[k] is uninitialized. Otherwise, we check V[T[k]], and verify that the first component of this pair is equal to k. If it is not, then T[k] is uninitialized (and just happened by accident to fall in the range {1, ..., m}). Otherwise, we know that T[k] is indeed one of the initialized cells, and the corresponding value is the second component of the pair.

== See also ==
- Double-checked locking
- Lazy loading
- Proxy pattern
- Singleton pattern
