= Namespace =

Container for a set of identifiers

In computing, a namespace is a set of signs (names) that are used to identify and refer to objects of various kinds. A namespace ensures that all of a given set of objects have unique names so that they can be easily identified.

Namespaces are commonly structured as hierarchies to allow reuse of names in different contexts. As an analogy, consider a system of naming of people where each person has a given name, as well as a family name shared with their relatives. If the first names of family members are unique only within each family, then each person can be uniquely identified by the combination of first name and family name; there is only one Jane Doe, though there may be many Janes. Within the namespace of the Doe family, just "Jane" suffices to unambiguously designate this person, while within the "global" namespace of all people, the full name must be used.

Prominent examples for namespaces include file systems, which assign names to files. Some programming languages organize their variables and subroutines in namespaces. Computer networks and distributed systems assign names to resources, such as computers, printers, websites, and remote files. Operating systems can partition kernel resources by isolated namespaces to support OS-level virtualization containers.

Similarly, hierarchical file systems organize files in directories. Each directory is a separate namespace, so that the directories "letters" and "invoices" may both contain a file "to_jane".

In computer programming, namespaces are typically used to group symbols and identifiers around a given task and to avoid name collisions between multiple identifiers that share the same name.

In computer networking, the Domain Name System organizes websites (and other resources) into hierarchical namespaces.

== Name conflicts ==
Element names are defined by the developer. This often results in a conflict when trying to mix XML documents from different XML applications.

This XML carries HTML table information:

<table>
    <tr>
        <td>Good</td>
        <td>Bad</td>
    </tr>
</table>

This XML carries information about a table (i.e. a piece of furniture):

<table>
    <name>Mahogany Coffee Table</name>
    <width>30</width>
    <length>120</length>
</table>

If these XML fragments were added together, there would be a name conflict. Both contain a <table>...</table> element, but the elements have different content and meaning.

An XML parser will not know how to handle these differences.

=== Solution via prefix ===
Name conflicts in XML can easily be avoided using a name prefix.

The following XML distinguishes between information about the HTML table and furniture by prefixing "h" and "f" at the beginning of the elements.

<h:table>
    <h:tr>
        <h:td>Good</h:td>
        <h:td>Bad</h:td>
    </h:tr>
</h:table>

<f:table>
    <f:name>Mahogany Coffee Table</f:name>
    <f:width>30</f:width>
    <f:length>120</f:length>
</f:table>

== Naming system ==
A name in a namespace consists of a namespace name and a local name. The namespace name is usually applied as a prefix to the local name.

In augmented Backus–Naur form:

name = <namespace name> separator <local name>

When local names are used by themselves, name resolution is used to decide which (if any) particular name is alluded to by some particular local name.

=== Examples ===
Examples of names in a namespace
Context	Name	Namespace name	Local name
Domain name	www.example.com	example.com (domain name)	www (subdomain name)
Wikipedia	Talk:Mona Lisa	Talk	Mona Lisa
Path (UNIX)	/home/admin/Documents/readme.txt	/home/admin/Documents (directory)	readme.txt (file name)
Path (Windows)	C:\Users\Admin\Documents\readme.txt	C:\Users\Admin\Documents (directory)	readme.txt (file name)
C++ standard library namespace	std::chrono::system_clock	std::chrono (C++ namespace)	system_clock (class)
C++ namespace	Poco::Net::HTTPClientSession	Poco::Net (C++ namespace)	HTTPClientSession (class)
C# namespace	System.Collections.Generic.Dictionary	System.Collections.Generic (C# namespace)	Dictionary (class)
Java standard library package	java.util.Date	java.util (Java package)	Date (class)
Java package	org.apache.commons.math3.special.Gamma	org.apache.commons.math3.special (Java package)	Gamma (class)
UN/LOCODE	US NYC	US (country or territory)	NYC (locality)
XML	xmlns:xhtml="http://www.w3.org/1999/xhtml" <xhtml:body>	xhtml (previously declared XML namespace xhtml="http://www.w3.org/1999/xhtml")	body (element)
Perl	$DBI::errstr	$DBI (Perl module)	errstr (variable)
Uniform Resource Name (URN)	urn:nbn:fi-fe19991055	urn:nbn (National Bibliography Numbers)	fi-fe19991055
Handle System	10.1000/182	10 (handle naming authority)	1000/182 (handle local name)
Digital object identifier	10.1000/182	10.1000 (publisher)	182 (publication)
MAC address	01-23-45-67-89-ab	01-23-45 (organizationally unique identifier)	67-89-ab (NIC specific)
PCI ID	1234 abcd	1234 (vendor ID)	abcd (device ID)
USB VID/PID	2341 003f	2341 (vendor ID)	003f (product ID)
SPARQL	dbr:Sydney	dbr (previously declared ontology, e.g. by specifying @prefix dbr: <http://dbpedia.org/resource/>)	Sydney

=== Delegation ===
Delegation of responsibilities between parties is important in real-world applications, such as the structure of the World Wide Web. Namespaces allow delegation of identifier assignment to multiple name issuing organisations whilst retaining global uniqueness. A central Registration authority registers the assigned namespace names allocated. Each namespace name is allocated to an organisation which is subsequently responsible for the assignment of names in their allocated namespace. This organisation may be a name issuing organisation that assign the names themselves, or another Registration authority which further delegates parts of their namespace to different organisations.

=== Hierarchy ===
A naming scheme that allows subdelegation of namespaces to third parties is a hierarchical namespace.

A hierarchy is recursive if the syntax for the namespace names is the same for each subdelegation. An example of a recursive hierarchy is the Domain name system.

An example of a non-recursive hierarchy are Uniform Resource Name representing an Internet Assigned Numbers Authority (IANA) number.

Hierarchical namespace breakdown for urn:isbn:978-3-16-148410-0, an identifier for the book The Logic of Scientific Discovery by Karl Popper, 10th edition.
Registry	Registrar	Example Identifier	Namespace name	Namespace
Uniform Resource Name (URN)	Internet Assigned Numbers Authority	urn:isbn:978-3-16-148410-0	urn	Formal URN namespace
Formal URN namespace	Internet Assigned Numbers Authority	urn:isbn:978-3-16-148410-0	ISBN	International Standard Book Numbers as Uniform Resource Names
International Article Number (EAN)	GS1	978-3-16-148410-0	978	Bookland
International Standard Book Number (ISBN)	International ISBN Agency	3-16-148410-X	3	German-speaking countries
German publisher code	Agentur für Buchmarktstandards	3-16-148410-X	16	Mohr Siebeck

=== Namespace versus scope ===
A namespace name may provide context (scope in computer science) to a name, and the terms are sometimes used interchangeably. However, the context of a name may also be provided by other factors, such as the location where it occurs or the syntax of the name.

Examples of naming systems with local and global scope, and with and without namespaces
	Without a namespace	With a namespace
Local scope	Vehicle registration plate	Filesystem Hierarchy Standard
Global scope	Universally unique identifier	Domain Name System

== In programming languages ==
For many programming languages, namespace is a context for their identifiers. In an operating system, an example of namespace is a directory. Each name in a directory uniquely identifies one file or subdirectory.

As a rule, names in a namespace cannot have more than one meaning; that is, different meanings cannot share the same name in the same namespace. A namespace is also called a context, because the same name in different namespaces can have different meanings, each one appropriate for its namespace.

Following are other characteristics of namespaces:

- Names in the namespace can represent objects as well as concepts, be the namespace a natural or ethnic language, a constructed language, the technical terminology of a profession, a dialect, a sociolect, or an artificial language (e.g., a programming language).
- In the Java programming language, identifiers that appear in namespaces have a short (local) name and a unique long "qualified" name for use outside the namespace.
- Some compilers (for languages such as C++) combine namespaces and names for internal use in the compiler in a process called name mangling.

As well as its abstract language technical usage as described above, some languages have a specific keyword used for explicit namespace control, amongst other uses. Below is an example of a namespace in C++:

import std;

// This is how one brings a name into the current scope. In this case, this brings them into global scope.
using std::println;

namespace box1 {
    constexpr int BOX_SIDE = 4;
}

namespace box2 {
    constexpr int BOX_SIDE = 12;
}

int main() {
    constexpr int BOX_SIDE = 42;
    println("{}", box1::BOX_SIDE); // Outputs 4.
    println("{}", box2::BOX_SIDE); // Outputs 12.
    println("{}", BOX_SIDE); // Outputs 42.
}

=== Computer-science considerations ===
A namespace in computer science (sometimes also called a name scope) is an abstract container or environment created to hold a logical grouping of unique identifiers or symbols (i.e. names). An identifier defined in a namespace is associated only with that namespace. The same identifier can be independently defined in multiple namespaces. That is, an identifier defined in one namespace may or may not have the same meaning as the same identifier defined in another namespace. Languages that support namespaces specify the rules that determine to which namespace an identifier (not its definition) belongs.

This concept can be illustrated with an analogy. Imagine that two companies, X and Y, each assign ID numbers to their employees. X should not have two employees with the same ID number, and likewise for Y; but it is not a problem for the same ID number to be used at both companies. For example, if Bill works for company X and Jane works for company Y, then it is not a problem for each of them to be employee #123. In this analogy, the ID number is the identifier, and the company serves as the namespace. It does not cause problems for the same identifier to identify a different person in each namespace.

In large computer programs or documents it is common to have hundreds or thousands of identifiers. Namespaces (or a similar technique, see Emulating namespaces) provide a mechanism for hiding local identifiers. They provide a means of grouping logically related identifiers into corresponding namespaces, thereby making the system more modular.

Data storage devices and many modern programming languages support namespaces. Storage devices use directories (or folders) as namespaces. This allows two files with the same name to be stored on the device so long as they are stored in different directories. In some programming languages (e.g. C++, Python), the identifiers naming namespaces are themselves associated with an enclosing namespace. Thus, in these languages namespaces can nest, forming a namespace tree. At the root of this tree is the unnamed global namespace.

==== Use in common languages ====
===== C =====
In C, although the language does not formally have namespaces (though they are frequently emulated), identifiers may be thought of as inhabiting different namespaces; that being ordinary identifiers, tags (struct/union/enum), member names, and labels. For instance, the name Foo may be reused in these four contexts:

#include <stdio.h>

// in the tag namespace
struct Foo {
    int Foo; // in the member namespace
};

// function name and parameter (ordinary identifiers)
struct Foo Foo(int Foo) {
    struct Foo result = { .Foo = Foo };
    if (Foo < 0) {
        goto Foo; // in the label namespace
    }

    return result;
Foo:
    result.Foo = 0;
    return result;
}

int main() {
    // creates a struct Foo, named Foo,
    // using the function Foo()
    struct Foo Foo = Foo(42);
    printf("%d\n", Foo.Foo);
}

Additionally, it is possible to use anonymous structs as namespaces in C since C99.

Math.h:

#pragma once

struct StatsNamespace {
    double (*mean)(const double*, size_t);
    double (*median)(const double*, size_t);
    // more functions...
}

struct MathNamespace {
    double PI;
    double E;
    double (*sin)(double);
    // more functions...

    // a "nested namespace"
    struct StatsNamespace Stats;
};

extern const struct MathNamespace Math;

Math.c:

#include <math.h>
#include "Math.h"

static double _sin(double arg) {
    return sin(arg);
}

static double _mean(const double* data, size_t size) {
    // ...
}

static double _median(const double* data, size_t size) {
    // ...
}

const struct MathNamespace Math = {
    .PI = M_PI,
    .E = M_E,
    .sin = _sin,
    // ...

    .Stats = {
        .mean = _mean,
        .median = _median,
        // ...
    }
};

Main.c:

#include <stdio.h>
#include "Math.h"

int main() {
    double dataset[] = {1.0, 2.0, 3.0, 4.0, 5.0};

    printf("sin(0) = %d\n", Math.sin(0));
    printf("pi is %f\n", Math.PI);
    printf("Average: %f\n", Math.Stats.mean(dataset, sizeof(dataset) / sizeof(double)));
}

===== C++ =====
In C++, a namespace is defined with a namespace block.

namespace abc {
    int bar;
}

Within this block, identifiers can be used exactly as they are declared. Outside of this block, the namespace specifier must be prefixed. For example, outside of namespace abc, bar must be written abc::bar to be accessed. C++ includes another construct that makes this verbosity unnecessary. By adding the line

using namespace abc;

to a piece of code, the prefix abc:: is no longer needed.

Identifiers that are not explicitly declared within a namespace are considered to be in the global namespace.

int foo;

These identifiers can be used exactly as they are declared, or, since the global namespace is unnamed, the namespace specifier :: can be prefixed. For example, foo can also be written ::foo.

Namespace resolution in C++ is hierarchical. This means that within the hypothetical namespace food::soup, the identifier Chicken refers to food::soup::Chicken. If food::soup::Chicken doesn't exist, it then refers to food::Chicken. If neither food::soup::Chicken nor food::Chicken exist, Chicken refers to ::Chicken, an identifier in the global namespace.

Namespaces in C++ are most often used to avoid naming collisions. Although namespaces are used extensively in recent C++ code, most older code does not use this facility because it did not exist in early versions of the language. For example, the entire C++ Standard Library is defined within namespace std, but before standardization many components were originally in the global namespace. The using statement can be used to import a symbol into the current scope.

The use of the using statements in headers for reasons other than backwards compatibility (e.g., convenience) is considered to be against good code practices, as those using statements propagate into all translation units that include the header. However, modules do not export using statements unless explicitly marked export, making using statements safer to use. For instance, one can import a module wikipedia.project.util with matching namespace wikipedia::project::util and then use using statements on symbols from that namespace to simplify verbose namespaces. Unlike other languages like Java or Rust, C++ modules, namespaces and source file structure do not necessarily match, though it is convention to match them for clarity (for example, module foo.bar.baz.Qux matches namespaced class foo::bar::baz::Qux and resides in file foo/bar/baz/Qux.cppm).

using should be used to simplify verbose nested namespaces when modular translation units are used.

export module wikipedia.project.App;

import std;

import wikipedia.project.fs;
import wikipedia.project.util;

using wikipedia::project::fs::File;
using wikipedia::project::util::ConfigLoader;
using wikipedia::project::util::logging::Logger;
using wikipedia::project::util::logging::LoggerFactory;

export namespace wikipedia::project {

class App {
private:
    Logger logger;
    // private fields and methods
public:
    App():
        logger{LoggerFactory::getLogger("Main")} {
        ConfigLoader cl(File("config/config_file.txt"));
        logger.log("Application starting...");
        // rest of code
    }
};

}

C++11 introduces inline namespaces, which is such that its members are treated as if they are also members of the enclosing namespace. It is declared by writing inline namespace. It is akin to an implicit using namespace statement, meaning qualifying symbols in it is optional.

The inline property is transitive. If a namespace a contains an inline namespace b, which in turn contains another inline namespace c, then members of c can be accessed as if they were members of a or b.

A primary use case for inline namespaces is ABI compatibility and versioning. By placing different versions of an API within distinct inline namespaces (e.g., v1, v2), and then making the currently desired version inline, library developers can manage ABI compatibility. When a new version is released, the inline keyword can be moved to the new version's namespace, allowing users to automatically link against the new version while still enabling access to older versions through explicit qualification.

namespace mylib::utils {
    namespace v1 {
        [[deprecated("Use mylib::utils::v2::func() instead")]]
        void func() {
            // Old implementation
        }
    }

    // v2 is the currently active version
    inline namespace v2 {
        void func() {
            // New implementation
        }
    }
}

int main() {
    // Calls mylib::utils::v2::func() implicitly
    mylib::utils::func();

    // Calls mylib::utils::v2::func() explicitly
    mylib::utils::v2::func();

    // Calls mylib::utils::v1::func() explicitly
    mylib::utils::v1::func();

    return 0;
}

C++ additionally allows declaring an "unnamed namespace" (also known as an "anonymous namespace"). All entities placed inside an unnamed namespace are given internal linkage. An unnamed namespace may be placed at any namespace. An unnamed namespace should not be confused for the global namespace.

namespace {
    class Foo;
}

namespace mylib {
    namespace {
        void bar();
    }
}

To "force" a type to always be preceded by some kind of qualification, Java's "utility classes" can be mimicked; in Java and C#, a "utility class" is a class whose constructor is private, and has only static fields and methods. This is because in C++, there are no ways to add a class's static members into scope (equivalent to Java's import static or C#'s using static).

import std;

// A "utility class", which essentially acts as a namespace whose members can never be unqualified
class Math final {
private:
    Math() = default;
public:
    static constexpr double PI = std::numbers::pi;
    static constexpr double E = std::numbers::e;

    static double sin(double x) noexcept {
        return std::sin(x);
    }

    // ...
};

int main() {
    // the members of Math must be accessed with Math::
    std::println("The sine of 1 is {}, the sine of π/2 is {}", Math::sin(1), Math::sin(Math::PI / 2));
}

===== C# =====
Namespaces are heavily used in C# language. All .NET framework classes are organized in namespaces. Namespaces are used by programmers to organize their work and to avoid naming collisions. When referencing a class, one may specify either its fully qualified name, meaning its namespace followed by the class name:

System.Console.WriteLine("Hello World!");
int i = System.Convert.ToInt32("123");

or add a using statement. This eliminates the need to mention the complete name of all classes in that namespace.

using System;

Console.WriteLine("Hello World!");
int i = Convert.ToInt32("123");

In the above examples, System is a namespace, and Console and Convert are classes defined within System.

Unlike C++, using can only import all symbols in a namespace (much like using namespace from C++, use * in Rust, or import * in Java). It cannot be used to import individual symbols and classes like it is used in Java.

namespace Wikipedia.Project;

using System;
using System.IO;

using Microsoft.Extensions.Logging;

using Wikipedia.Project.Utility;

class App
{
    private static ILogger<Program> logger;

    public App()
    {
        ConfigLoader cl = new(Path.Combine("config", "config_file.txt"));
        LoggerFactory loggerFactory = LoggerFactory.Create(builder => 
        {
            builder.AddConsole();
        });
        logger = loggerFactory.CreateLogger<Program>();
        logger.LogInformation("Application starting...");
        // rest of code
    }
}

Unlike C++, C# namespaces do not allow relative referencing of symbols. For example, the class Foo.Bar.Baz.Qux cannot be referred to as Baz.Qux even if referred to from within namespace Foo.Bar: either the namespace Foo.Bar.Baz must be imported to refer to class Qux, or Foo.Bar.Baz.Qux must be fully qualified.

In C#, classes act as namespaces for individual functions and variables, because C# does not allow free functions or variables. However, all of a class's static functions and variables can be added into scope using using static:

using static System.Console;
using static System.Math;

// Console.WriteLine() -> WriteLine(), Math.Sin() -> Sin(), Math.PI -> PI
WriteLine($"The sine of 1 is {Sin(1)}, the sine of π/2 is {Sin(PI / 2)");

===== ECMAScript =====
ECMAScript (such as JavaScript) provides modules, which are the most common form of namespacing in ECMAScript languages. Modules do not have to be named, but they simply receive the file name as the module name. Any symbol inside the module that needs to be publicly accessible must be marked export.

// Geometry.ts
export const SHAPE_TYPE: string = "2D";

export function calculateArea(radius: number): number {
    return Math.PI * radius * radius;
}

export function calculateCircumference(radius: number): number {
    return 2 * Math.PI * radius;
}

export class Canvas {
    constructor(private width: number, private height: number) {}
}

Then, to import the module, use the import keyword followed by a list of symbols (or * for all), with an optional alias (as), and the path to the module:

// App.ts
import * as Geometry from "./geometry.js";
import process from 'node:process';

async function main(): Promise<void> {
    console.log(Geometry.SHAPE_TYPE);

    const area: number = Geometry.calculateArea(5);
    console.log(`Area: ${area}`);

    const canvas = new Geometry.Canvas(100, 200);
    // ...
}

main().catch((error) => {
    console.error("Application crashed:", error);
    process.exit(1);
});

TypeScript additionally features its own older namespace system, sometimes called "internal modules" in older versions. These use the namespace keyword:

namespace Validation {
    export interface StringValidator {
        isValid(s: string): boolean;
    }

    export const numRegex: RegExp = /^[0-9]+$/;
}

// Usage in another file (often requiring a global reference)
const myValid: Validation.StringValidator = { ... };

ECMAScript 4, which later was abandoned, but adopted in ActionScript 3, had both packages (like Java), as well as namespaces, which were qualifiers of a definition's name. An "unnamed package" basically acted as the global namespace, which was implicitly imported by all other packages (and given by package { /* ... */ }).

package org.wikipedia.examples {
    public namespace English;
    public namespace French;

    public class BilingualGreeter {
        English function hello(): void {
            console.log("Hello, world!");
        }

        French function hello(): void {
            console.log("Bonjour, le monde!");
        }
    }
}

import org.wikipedia.examples.BilingualGreeter;

var greeter: BilingualGreeter = new BilingualGreeter();
use namespace English; // add all English namespace identifiers into scope

greeter.hello(); // invokes English version
greeter.French::hello(); // invokes French version

===== Java =====
In Java, the idea of a namespace is embodied in Java packages. All code belongs to a package, although that package need not be explicitly named. Code from other packages is accessed by prefixing the package name before the appropriate identifier, for example class String in package java.lang can be referred to as java.lang.String (this is known as the fully qualified class name). Like C++, Java offers a construct that makes it unnecessary to type the package name (import). However, certain features (such as reflection) require the programmer to use the fully qualified name.

Unlike C++, namespaces in Java are not hierarchical as to the syntax of the language. However, packages are named in a hierarchical manner. For example, all packages beginning with java are a part of the Java platform—the package java.lang contains classes core to the language, and java.lang.reflect contains core classes specifically relating to reflection.

In Java (and Ada, C#, and others), namespaces/packages express semantic categories of code. For example, in C#, namespace System contains code provided by the system (the .NET framework). How specific these categories are and how deep the hierarchies go differ from language to language.

Function and class scopes can be viewed as implicit namespaces that are inextricably linked with visibility, accessibility, and object lifetime.

In Java, packages cannot be partially qualified like they can in C++. For instance, it is not possible to import the java namespace and then refer to java.util.ArrayList as util.ArrayList. Symbols must either be fully qualified or imported completely into scope. import statements are not transitive nor can they be deliberately marked export like in C++; additionally, they are not recursive (for example import java.util.*; does not also do import java.util.concurrent.*;). All import statements must appear at the beginning of the file, and cannot be written at any other scope. This is in contrast to C++, where the std namespace can be imported by writing using namespace std;, and then std::chrono::system_clock can be referred to as chrono::system_clock.

package org.wikipedia.project;

import java.nio.file.Paths;
import java.util.logging.Level;
import java.util.logging.Logger;

import org.wikipdia.project.util.ConfigLoader;

public class App {
    private static final Logger logger = Logger.getLogger(Main.class.getName());

    public App() {
        ConfigLoader cl = new ConfigLoader(Paths.get("config/config_file.txt"));
        logger.log(Level.INFO, "Application starting...");
        // rest of code
    }
}

Because Java does not support independent functions outside of classes, static class methods and so-called "utility classes" (classes with private constructors and all methods and fields static) are the equivalent to C++-style namespaces. Some examples are java.lang.Math, which contains the constants like Math.PI and methods like Math.sin().

import statements can be used to import all symbols in a package, called a wildcard import, which is similar to using namespace in C++. For instance, writing import java.util.*; imports all classes in the java.util package. This however, can cause symbol pollution within a file. Furthermore, using glob import statements on packages that have classes with the same name can cause ambiguity, and will fail to compile. However, java.lang.* is implicitly imported into all Java source files by default.

import java.sql.*; // Imports all classes in java.sql, including java.sql.Date
import java.util.*; // Imports all classes in java.util, including java.util.Date

Date d = new Date(); // Ambiguous Date reference resulting in compilation error

// Instead, the fully-qualified names must be used:
java.sql.Date sqlDate = new java.sql.Date(System.currentTimeMillis());
java.util.Date utilDate = new java.util.Date();

In Java, classes act as namespaces for individual functions and variables, because Java does not allow free functions or variables. However, all of a class's static functions and variables can be added into scope using a static import, written with import static:

import static java.lang.Math.PI;
import static java.lang.Math.sin;
import static java.lang.System.out;

// System.out.printf() -> out.printf(), Math.sin() -> sin(), Math.PI -> PI
out.printf("The sine of 1 is %f, the sine of π/2 is %f%n", sin(1), sin(PI / 2));

===== Kotlin =====
Kotlin packages are very similar to Java packages, but unlike Java where only class-like objects may reside directly in a package, any top-level symbol (such as a variable, class, type alias, etc.) may live directly inside a package.

package org.wikipedia.examples

import kotlin.math.PI

var myPi = PI

fun circleArea(radius: Double): Double {
    return myPi * radius * radius
}

However, even though Kotlin allows top-level non-class objects to reside directly in a package, this is represented in the Java Virtual Machine internally as residing inside a generated class, resembling something like the following:

package org.wikipedia.examples;

public final class ExampleKt {

    private static double myPi = Math.PI;

    public static final double getMyPi() {
        return myPi;
    }

    public static final void setMyPi(double value) {
        myPi = value;
    }

    public static final double circleArea(double radius) {
        return myPi * radius * radius;
    }
}

===== PHP =====
Namespaces were introduced into PHP from version 5.3 onwards. Naming collision of classes, functions and variables can be avoided. In PHP, a namespace is defined with a namespace block.

# File phpstar/foobar.php

namespace phpstar;

class FooBar
{
    public function foo(): void
    {
        echo 'Hello world, from function foo';
    }

    public function bar(): void
    {
        echo 'Hello world, from function bar';
    }
}

We can reference a PHP namespace with the following different ways:

# File index.php

# Include the file
include "phpstar/foobar.php";

# Option 1: directly prefix the class name with the namespace
$obj_foobar = new \phpstar\FooBar();

# Option 2: import the namespace
use phpstar\FooBar;
$obj_foobar = new FooBar();

# Option 2a: import & alias the namespace
use phpstar\FooBar as FB;
$obj_foobar = new FB();

# Access the properties and methods with regular way
$obj_foobar->foo();
$obj_foobar->bar();

===== Python =====
In Python, namespaces are defined by the individual modules, and since modules can be contained in hierarchical packages, then namespaces are hierarchical too. In general when a module is imported then the names defined in the module are defined via that module's namespace, and are accessed in from the calling modules by using the fully qualified name.

# assume mod_a defines two functions : func1() and func2() and one class : Class1
import mod_a

mod_a.func1()
mod_a.func2()
a: mod_a.Class1 = mod_a.Class1()

The from ... import ... statement can be used to insert the relevant names directly into the calling module's namespace, and those names can be accessed from the calling module without the qualified name:

# assume mod_a defines two functions : func1() and func2() and one class : Class1
from mod_a import func1

func1()
func2() # this will fail as an undefined name, as will the full name mod_a.func2()
a: Class1 = Class1() # this will fail as an undefined name, as will the full name mod_a.Class1()

Since this directly imports names (without qualification) it can overwrite existing names with no warnings.

A special form of the statement is from ... import * which imports all names defined in the named package directly in the calling module's namespace. Use of this form of import, although supported within the language, is generally discouraged as it pollutes the namespace of the calling module and will cause already defined names to be overwritten in the case of name clashes, though using from import in Python can simplify verbose namespaces, such as nested namespaces.

from selenium.webdriver import Firefox
from selenium.webdriver.common.action_chains import ActionChains
from selenium.webdriver.common.by import By
from selenium.webdriver.common.keys import Keys
from selenium.webdriver.remote.webelement import WebElement

if __name__ == "__main__":
    driver: Firefox = Firefox()
    element: WebElement = driver.find_element(By.ID, "myInputField")
    element.send_keys(f"Hello World{Keys.ENTER}")
    action: ActionChains = ActionChains(driver)
    action.key_down(Keys.CONTROL).send_keys('a').key_up(Keys.CONTROL).perform()

Python also supports import x as y as a way of providing an alias or alternative name for use by the calling module:

import numpy as np
from numpy.typing import NDArray, float32

a: NDArray[float32] = np.arange(1000)

===== Rust =====
In Rust, a namespace is called a "module" and declared using mod. Symbols inside the module are by default private, and cannot be accessed externally, unless declared with the pub keyword which exposes them. Modules can have sub-modules inside of them, allowing for nested namespaces.

Similar to the using keyword in C++, Rust has the use keyword to import symbols into the current scope.

mod my_module {
    pub trait Greet {
        fn greet(&self);
    }

    pub struct Person {
        pub name: String,
    }

    impl Greet for Person {
        fn greet(&self) {
            println!("Hello, {}!", self.name);
        }
    }
}

fn main() {
    use my_module::{Person, Greet};

    let person = Person { name: String::from("Alice") };
    person.greet();
}

Writing mod util; indicates to the compiler to find either a file named util.rs or util/mod.rs. crate in a use statement refers to the root of the current "crate" (project), while super can be used to refer to the parent module.

mod util;

use std::fs::File;

use crate::util::ConfigLoader;
use crate::util::logging::{Logger, LoggerFactory};

pub struct App {
    config_loader: ConfigLoader;
}

impl App {
    pub fn new() -> Self {
        config_loader = ConfigLoader::new(File::open("config/config_file.txt"));
        config_loader.load();
        let logger: Logger = LoggerFactory::get_logger("Main");
        logger.log("Application starting...");
        // rest of code
    }
}

The use keyword in Rust is more versatile than its counterpart using in C++. In addition to importing single symbols, symbol aliasing with as and glob imports, use can import multiple symbols on the same line using braces (which may be nested), import individual namespaces, and do all of the above in a single statement. This is an example of using all of the above:

use std::{
    alloc::Layout, // imports std::alloc::Layout
    fmt::*, // imports all symbols in std::fmt
    fs::{File, Metadata}, // imports std::fs::File and std::fs::Metadata
    io::{prelude::*, BufReader, BufWriter}, // imports all symbols in std::io::prelude::*, std::io::BufReader, and std::io::BufWriter
    process, // imports the std::process namespace (for example std::process::Command can be referred to as process::Command)
    time::{self, Duration}, // imports the std::time namespace and std::time::Duration
};

use std::fmt::Result as FmtResult; // renames std::fmt::Result to FmtResult

===== XML namespace =====
In XML, the XML namespace specification enables the names of elements and attributes in an XML document to be unique, similar to the role of namespaces in programming languages. Using XML namespaces, XML documents may contain element or attribute names from more than one XML vocabulary.

===== SAP Namespace =====
In SAP systems (especially ABAP environments), namespaces are used to prevent naming collisions between standard SAP-delivered objects and customer or partner developments.

A namespace identifier is delimited with / (for example /MYNS/) and is reserved via SAP's namespace registration process. Once reserved, objects created under that namespace are uniquely identifiable and protected from unintended overwrite by SAP upgrades or imports.

In modern SAP landscapes (such as ABAP in the cloud and HDI containers), namespaces are also used to semantically group development artifacts or bundles.

=== Emulating namespaces ===
In programming languages lacking language support for namespaces, namespaces can be emulated to some extent by using an identifier naming convention. For example, C libraries such as libpng often use a fixed prefix for all functions and variables that are part of their exposed interface. Libpng exposes identifiers such as:

png_create_write_struct
png_get_signature
png_read_row
png_set_invalid

This naming convention provides reasonable assurance that the identifiers are unique and can therefore be used in larger programs without naming collisions. Likewise, many packages originally written in Fortran (e.g., BLAS, LAPACK) reserve the first few letters of a function's name to indicate the group to which the function belongs.

This technique has several drawbacks:

- It does not scale well to nested namespaces; identifiers become excessively long since all uses of the identifiers must be fully namespace-qualified;
- Individuals or organizations may use inconsistent naming conventions, potentially introducing unwanted obfuscation;
- Compound or "query-based" operations on groups of identifiers, based on the namespaces in which they are declared, are rendered unwieldy or unfeasible;
- In languages with restricted identifier length, the use of prefixes limits the number of characters that can be used to identify what the function does; this is a particular problem for packages originally written in FORTRAN 77, which offered only 6 characters per identifier; for example, the name of the BLAS function DGEMM indicates that it operates on double-precision floating-point numbers (D) and general matrices (GE), with only the last two characters (MM) showing what it actually does: matrix–matrix multiplication.

It also has a few advantages:

- No special software tools are required to locate names in source-code files; a simple program like grep suffices;
- There are no namespace-related name conflicts;
- There is no need for name mangling, and thus no potential incompatibility problems.

== See also ==
- 11-digit delivery point ZIP code
- Binomial nomenclature (genus-species in biology)
- Chemical nomenclature
- Dewey Decimal Classification
- Digital object identifier
- Domain Name System
- Identity (object-oriented programming)
- Library of Congress Classification
- Star catalogues and astronomical naming conventions
- Violation of abstraction level
- XML namespace
- Argument-dependent name lookup
