= Manifest file =

File containing metadata for other files in a group

In computer programming, a manifest file is a file containing metadata for a group of accompanying files that are part of a set or coherent unit. For example, the files of a computer program may have a manifest describing the name, version number, license and the constituent files of the program. The term "manifest" is borrowed from a cargo shipping procedure, where a ship manifest would list the crew and/or cargo of a vessel.

Manifest files are similar in nature to declaration files in that both specify the expected structure of a computer program to be consumed by another computer program, providing additional information that allow system software, software-defined tools (e.g., compilers, linters), development environments, or other developers to understand how to interact with certain resources or code. Unlike declaration files, manifests do this in different ways and for different purposes. For instance, manifest files describe things like dependencies, permissions, or runtime settings that control the execution of code. Declaration files describe the structure of code (such as types, interfaces, or functions) to control the translation of code, support static type-checking, and enable convenient features like autocompletion and automatic code refactoring.

Build systems and operating systems may use manifest files to understand how to set up, execute, or integrate a computer program into an existing system. Furthermore, while manifest files focus on project-level or system-level information (like runtime settings or dependencies), declaration files focus on code-level details (like the types or signatures of functions and objects).

== Types ==
=== Package manifest ===
Linux distributions rely heavily on package management systems for distributing software. In this scheme, a package is an archive file containing a manifest file. The primary purpose is to enumerate the files which are included in the distribution, either for processing by various packaging tools or for human consumption. Manifests may contain additional information; for example, in JAR (a package format for delivering software written in Java), they can specify a version number and an entry point for execution. The manifest may optionally contain a cryptographic hash or checksum of each file. By creating a cryptographic signature for such a manifest file, the entire contents of the distribution package can be validated for authenticity and integrity, as altering any of the files will invalidate the checksums in the manifest file.

=== Application and assembly manifest ===
In Microsoft Windows, software that relies on Windows Side-by-Side (WinSxS) needs an application manifest, which is an XML document that is either embedded in an executable file or contained in a separate XML file that accompanies it. It bears name, version, trust information, privileges required for execution and dependencies on other components.

An assembly manifest is very similar to an application manifest but describes the identity of components known as "assemblies". These assemblies are referred to in the application manifest.

An example of an application manifest is as follows. This application manifest has two core parts: Security and dependency. The security part says that the application requires "asInvoker" security level; that is, it can be operated at whatever security level it is executed. The dependency part says the application needs a component called "Microsoft.VC90.CRT" with version number "9.0.21022.8".

<?xml version='1.0' encoding='UTF-8' standalone='yes'?>
<assembly xmlns='urn:schemas-microsoft-com:asm.v1' manifestVersion='1.0'>
  <trustInfo xmlns="urn:schemas-microsoft-com:asm.v3">
    <security>
      <requestedPrivileges>
        <!--I am okay with whatever security privilege level-->
        <requestedExecutionLevel level='asInvoker' uiAccess='false' />
      </requestedPrivileges>
    </security>
  </trustInfo>
  <dependency>
    <dependentAssembly>
      <!--I need Microsoft Visual C++ 2008 Runtime to run-->
      <assemblyIdentity type='win32' name='Microsoft.VC90.CRT' version='9.0.21022.8' processorArchitecture='x86' publicKeyToken='1fc8b3b9a1e18e3b' />
    </dependentAssembly>
  </dependency>
</assembly>

=== HTML5 cache manifest ===
A cache manifest in HTML5 was a plain text file accompanying a web app that helps it run when there is no network connectivity. The caching mechanism of web browser did read this file and ensured that its contents are available locally. An HTML5 cache manifest has to be served with its content type set to "text/cache-manifest". Major web browsers removed support for the cache manifest. Using service workers is recommended instead.

Example of a cache manifest:

CACHE MANIFEST 
/test.css
/test.js
/test.png

=== Webmanifest ===
A webmanifest is a JSON file used in progressive web apps to make them easily shareable via a URL, discoverable by a search engines, and alleviates complex installation procedures. Furthermore, PWAs support native app-style interactions and navigation, including being added to home screen, displaying splash screens, etc.

=== WebExtension manifest ===
The WebExtension manifest is a file called manifest.json used to configure browser extensions. The standard is currently in version 3, but version 2 is still supported by gecko-based browsers like Mozilla Firefox.
