= List of Ruby software and tools =

List of notable software written in or for the Ruby programming language

This is a list of software and programming tools for the Ruby programming language, which includes libraries, web frameworks, implementations, tools, and related projects.

== Web tools ==
- Capistrano (software) – remote server automation tool
- Mongrel – Ruby web server
- Rack – interface between web servers and web applications
- Ruby on Rails – full-stack web application framework
- Sinatra – lightweight Ruby web application framework
- Spree Commerce – e-commerce platform
- WEBrick – Ruby HTTP server toolkit

== Libraries ==
- BioRuby – bioinformatics and computational biology library for Ruby
- Bogus – Ruby library for creating reliable test doubles with contract verification
- ERuby – embedded Ruby templating
- EventMachine – event-driven I/O library
- Factory Bot – test fixtures library
- Fat comma – Ruby library for JSON-like hash syntax
- Geocoder – Ruby library for geocoding and reverse geocoding addresses
- Haml – HTML templating engine
- Markaby – HTML generation via Ruby
- Nokogiri – XML/HTML parsing library
- RSpec – behavior-driven testing framework for Ruby
- RubyGems – package manager for Ruby libraries and applications
- Sass – CSS preprocessor
- Sidekiq – background job framework for Ruby, used to handle asynchronous tasks.
- Uconv – Unicode text conversion library
- Watir – web application testing framework

== Ruby implementations ==
- HotRuby – Ruby interpreter implemented in JavaScript, enabling Ruby code to run in web browsers.
- IronRuby – Ruby for .NET platform
- JRuby – Ruby on the Java Virtual Machine
- MacRuby – Ruby implementation for macOS
- Mod ruby – Apache module that embeds the Ruby interpreter to improve performance of Ruby web applications
- Mruby – lightweight Ruby interpreter
- Rubinius – alternative Ruby implementation, based loosely on the Smalltalk-80 Blue Book design.
- Ruby MRI – the standard Ruby interpreter
- YARV – "Yet Another Ruby VM," the bytecode interpreter used in modern Ruby implementations

== Tools ==
- Homebrew – package manager for macOS and Linux written in Ruby
- Pry – interactive Ruby shell
- Rake – build and task management
- Ruby Version Manager – environment manager
- RubyCocoa – bridge between Ruby and Cocoa
- RubyForge – project hosting site
- RubyMotion – for iOS/macOS development
- RubySpec – language specification tests

== Integrated Development Environments ==
- Aptana Studio — integrated RadRails plugin for Ruby on Rails development
- Eclipse DLTK Ruby Plugin — Ruby development plugin for Eclipse
- Eric — open-source Python-based IDE with Ruby support
- Komodo IDE — commercial cross-platform IDE with Ruby support
- RubyMine — commercial IDE for Ruby and Rails by JetBrains
- SlickEdit — commercial cross-platform IDE with Ruby support

== List of websites using Ruby on Rails ==
- Airbnb
- Basecamp
- Diaspora – decentralized social network application built with Ruby on Rails
- Discourse – open-source discussion platform built with Ruby on Rails
- Fiverr
- GitHub
- Hulu
- Shopify
- SoundCloud
- Twitch
- Zendesk

== See also ==
- Free software programmed in Ruby
- List of C software and tools
- List of C++ software and tools
- List of C# software
- List of Java frameworks
- List of JavaScript libraries and Comparison of JavaScript-based web frameworks
- List of Python software
- List of Ruby programming books
- Network Applied Communication Laboratory (NaCl) – Ruby research lab
- Ruby Central – Ruby advocacy organization
- RubyKaigi – annual Ruby conference
