= Ruby Version Manager =

Software tool to manage Ruby programming language versions

- Developer(s): Wayne E. Seguin, Michal Papis
- Stable release: 1.29.12 / January 15, 2021; 4 years ago
- Repository: github.com/rvm/rvm
- Written in: Bash, Ruby
- Operating system: Unix-like
- License: Apache License 2.0
- Website: rvm.io

Ruby Version Manager, often abbreviated as RVM, is a software platform for Unix-like operating systems designed to manage multiple installations of Ruby on the same device.

The entire Ruby environment including the Ruby interpreter, installed RubyGems (gems), and documentation is partitioned. A developer can then switch between the different versions to work on several projects with different version requirements. In addition to MRI, the standard Ruby interpreter, RVM functions as an installer for various other implementations of Ruby. These include JRuby, mruby, MacRuby, IronRuby, Maglev, Rubinius, Ruby Enterprise Edition, Topaz, and GoRuby (an interpreter optimized for code golf). In addition, RVM supports the installation of patched versions of MRI.

RVM provides features for organization of Ruby gems through "gemsets", collections of gems separated by a namespace and associated Ruby installation. Gemsets can be associated with directories/projects through the use of the RVM-exclusive .rvmrc file. An alternative to using the .rvmrc file (and the general purpose although user-specific .jrubyrc) and its format is use of the .ruby-version and .ruby-gemset files, which are compatible with other ruby version managers, such as RBenv and chruby. Additionally, using .rvmrc requires trusting to prevent execution of unauthorized code, while .ruby-version does not.
