= NObjective =

- Stable release: 0.9.5 / January 29, 2009
- Operating system: Mac OS X Tiger; Mac OS X Leopard
- License: LGPL
- Website: code.google.com/p/nobjective

NObjective is a Mono to Cocoa bridge.

NObjective is high-performance bridge between managed .NET and unmanaged Cocoa worlds. It provides automatically generated proxies for all Objective-C classes and can be used to export managed classes to unmanaged Objective-C runtime.

Key features:

- Lowest processor and memory overheads compared to similar bridges; see project page for performance benchmark results
- Ability to automatically import Objective-C classes
  - Essential enums and structs are also automatically imported
- Ability to export .NET Framework classes to Objective-C runtime
- Ability to rethrow exceptions across runtimes in both directions
- Ability to work on Mac OS X Tiger, Mac OS X Leopard

== See also ==
- Cocoa (API)
- Mono (software)
- Cocoa Sharp
- Monobjc
- PyObjC
- RubyCocoa
