= Maglev (disambiguation) =

Maglev is a form of rail transport using magnetic levitation.

Maglev may also refer to:

- Magnetic levitation, a method by which an object is suspended using magnetic fields
- MagLev (software), an implementation of the Ruby programming language
