= PyObjC =

MacOS programming tool

- Original author: Lele Gaifax
- Developers: Ronald Oussoren, Bill Bumgarner, Steve Majewski, et al.
- Release: September 1996; 30 years ago
- Stable release: 11.0 / January 15, 2025; 21 months ago
- Written in: Python
- Operating system: Cross-platform
- License: MIT License
- Website: pyobjc.readthedocs.io/en/latest/
- Repository: github.com/ronaldoussoren/pyobjc

PyObjC is a bidirectional bridge between the Python and Objective-C programming languages, allowing programmers to use and extend existing Objective-C libraries, such as Apple's Cocoa framework, using Python.

PyObjC is used to develop macOS applications in pure Python.

There is also limited support for GNUstep, an open source, cross-platform implementation of Cocoa.

== For Python programmers ==
The most important usage of PyObjC is enabling programmers to create GUI applications using Cocoa libraries in pure Python. Moreover, as an effect of Objective-C's close relationship with the C programming language (it is a pure superset), developers are also able to incorporate any C-based API by wrapping it with an Objective-C wrapper and then using the wrapped code over the PyObjC bridge. Using Objective-C++, the same can be done with C++ libraries.

== For Objective-C programmers ==
Cocoa developers may also benefit, as tasks written in Python generally take fewer lines than the Objective-C equivalent. This can be used to their advantage as it enables faster prototyping.

== History ==
PyObjC's origins date back to 1996, when Lele Gaifax built the original module in September of that year. Among the credited contributors were Guido van Rossum, creator of the Python programming language.

PyObjC was rewritten in 2002. Notable additions include the ability to directly subclass Objective-C classes from Python and nearly complete support for the Foundation, App Kit and Address Book frameworks.

Later the same year, support was added for non-framework Python builds, as well as subsequent support for the Python distribution included with Mac OS X. Along with these changes came project templates for standalone Cocoa applications for use with Project Builder, the predecessor to the current Apple platform IDE, Xcode.

Apple incorporated PyObjC into Mac OS X in 2007, with the release of Mac OS X 10.5 Leopard.

== Messages and methods ==
In Objective-C, objects communicate with each other by sending messages, which is analogous to method calls in other object-oriented languages. When an object receives a message, it looks up the message's name, or selector, and matches it up with a method designated the same selector, which it then invokes.

The syntax for these message expressions is inherited from Smalltalk, and appears as an object, called the receiver, placed to the left of the name of the message, or selector, and both are enclosed within a pair of square brackets (the square bracket syntax is not inherited from Smalltalk). Colons within a selector indicate that it accepts one or more arguments, one for each colon. Intended to improve code readability, colons are placed within the selector such that when the required arguments are in place, the expression's intent is unambiguous:

   [myLittleDuck makeSomeNoise:quack eyesClosed:@YES onOneFoot:@YES];

This is distinct from the syntax used in Python, and in many other languages, where an equivalent expression would read:

    myLittleDuck.makeSomeNoise_eyesClosed_onOneFoot_(quack, True, True)

Translating Objective-C selectors to Python method names is accomplished by replacing each colon with a single underscore and listing the arguments within a pair of parentheses at the end, as demonstrated above.

== Classes ==
Objective-C classes are subclassed in the same manner as a normal Python class:

class MyDuck(NSObject):                   # NSObject is a base Objective-C class.
    def init(self):
        self = super(MyDuck, self).init() # An Objective-C idiom, wherein the
                                          # subclass instance, self, is instantiated
                                          # by sending the superclass its
                                          # designated initializer.
        return self

myLittleDuckOne = MyDuck.alloc().init()

== See also ==
- libffi
- RubyCocoa
