= Jedit X =

Commercial text editor

- Developer: Artman21
- Stable release: Rev. 2.15 / April 20, 2009
- Operating system: Mac OS X
- Type: text editor
- License: Shareware
- Website: http://www.artman21.com/en/jedit_x

Jedit X is a commercial text editor made in Japan by Artman21. It is a complete re-write of Jedit 4.0 in the Cocoa API. Jedit has been around since 1995 and is a general purpose text editor, with extra features related to supporting the Japanese language. It is available in both English and Japanese localizations.

== Overview ==
The standard text editing software for Classic Mac OS / macOS. It has a wide range of users, from application developers and web coders to writers and editors.

In the Classic Mac OS era, Jedit was called Jedit, and versions 1 through 4 existed. Rattles.

Jedit X 1.0 was released, resetting the version numbering from Jedit X, which was developed in Cocoa exclusively for Mac OS X. Plug-ins were released from Jedit X, and users can add or remove plug-ins according to their preferences to make it a multifunctional editor. Jedit X is now available as Jedit X 1.0.
