= Fluentd =

Open-source software project

- Developer: Treasure Data
- Release: 10 October 2011; 14 years ago
- Stable release: 1.19.2 / February 19, 2026; 7 months ago
- Written in: C, Ruby
- Operating system: Linux (Amazon Linux, CentOS, RHEL), macOS (10.9 and above), Windows (7 and above)
- Type: Logging tool
- License: Apache 2.0
- Website: www.fluentd.org
- Repository: github.com/fluent/fluentd

Fluentd is a cross-platform open-source data collection software project originally developed at Treasure Data. It is written primarily in the C programming language with a thin-Ruby wrapper that gives users flexibility.

== Overview ==
Fluentd was positioned for "big data," semi- or un-structured data sets. It analyzes event logs, application logs, and clickstreams. According to Suonsyrjä and Mikkonen, the "core idea of Fluentd is to be the unifying layer between different types of log inputs and outputs.", Fluentd is available on Linux, macOS, and Windows.

== History ==
Fluentd is written by Sadayuki Furuhashi under the development of the Treasure Data company. It was designed in 2011 and published as open source software in October 2011. In 2013, the company announced the funding of $5 million. Treasure Data was acquired by Arm Limited (now known as ARM Limited). Arm] in 2018. Fluentd was accepted as a hosted project by the Cloud Native Computing Foundation (CNCF) in November 2016.Fluentd has passed from the CNCF's incubation program on 11 April 2019. It has been continued developing after graduation, and Fluentd releases in the 2020s. In 2024, Fluentd versions 1.16.4, 1.16.5, 1.17.0, 1.17.1 and 1.18.0 were released, demonstrating continued active development.

== Users ==
Fluentd was one of the data collection tools recommended by Amazon Web Services in 2013, when it was said to be similar to Apache Flume or Scribe. Google Cloud Platform's BigQuery recommends Fluentd as the default real-time data-ingestion tool, and uses Google's customized version of Fluentd, called google-fluentd, as a default logging agent.

== Fluent Bit ==
Fluent Bit is a log processor and log forwarder that is being developed as a CNCF sub-project under the umbrella of Fluent project. Fluentd is written in C and Ruby and consumes at least 60 megabytes of memory. Fluent Bit is written only in C, with no dependencies, and consumes approximately one megabyte of memory, making it easier to run under embedded Linux and in containers.
