= Treasure Data =

American software company

- Type: Private
- Industry: Digital marketing
- Founded: 2011
- Headquarters: Mountain View, California
- Key people: Kazuki "Kaz" Ohta (Co-founder, CEO); Hironobu Yoshikawa (Co-founder, chairman); Sadayuki Furuhashi (Co-founder, chief architect); Dan Weirich (COO, CFO)
- Products: Customer data platforms, Fluentd
- Number of employees: ~700 (2023)
- Website: treasuredata.com

Treasure Data is a privately held company that provides customer data platforms in the form of data management and analytics software. The company developed Fluentd, a cross-platform open-source data collection software. Treasure Data is used by more than 450 organizations worldwide, including AB InBev, Subaru, Stellantis, and Yum! Brands.

== History ==
Kazuki Ohta, Hironobu Yoshikawa and Sadayuki Furuhashi founded Treasure Data in 2011. Yahoo! founder Jerry Yang was one of Treasure Data's angel donors and board members. In that same year, the company created Fluentd, a cross-platform open-source data collection software project, written primarily in Ruby (a programming language developed by Yukihiro Matsumoto, another investor in Treasure Data).

Treasure Data secured $5 million in Series A funding backed by Sierra Ventures in 2013. The company would later raise $15 million in Series B funding led by Scale Venture Partners in 2015.

In 2018, Treasure Data was purchased for $600 million by Arm Ltd., a British semiconductor and software design company, owned by the Softbank Group, a Japanese multinational investment holding company. Technology from the company was used in combination with other acquisitions by Arm to create the Arm Pelion IoT Platform, an internet-of-things connectivity, device and data management platform. When Arm entered into an agreement to be acquired in 2021 by NVIDIA for $40 billion, Arm's IoT Services Group (which included Treasure Data) was not included in the sale. As a result, the company was spun out by Softbank Corp., becoming an independent company with a valuation near $1 billion. Treasure Data would go on to raise $234 million in funding led by the Softbank Group, where the total amount was considered the largest single funding round for a customer data platform at the time.
