= CocoaPods =

Computer software package manager

- Original author: Eloy Durán
- Developers: Ben Asher, Dimitris Koutsogiorgas, Danielle Lancashire, Orta Therox, Paul Beusterien and Samuel Giddins
- Stable release: 1.16.2
- Preview release: October 31, 2024; 2 years ago
- Written in: Ruby
- Platform: macOS, iOS, watchOS, tvOS
- Type: Package manager
- License: MIT License
- Website: cocoapods.org

CocoaPods is an application-level dependency manager for Objective-C, Swift and any other languages that run on the Objective-C runtime, such as RubyMotion, that provides a standard format for managing external libraries. It was developed by Eloy Durán and Fabio Pelosin, who continue to manage the project with the help and contributions of many others. They began development in August 2011 and made the first public release on September 1, 2011. CocoaPods is strongly inspired by a combination of the Ruby projects RubyGems and Bundler. It claims to have over 103 thousand libraries and to be used in over 3 million apps.

CocoaPods focuses on source-based distribution of third party code and automatic integration into Xcode projects.

CocoaPods runs from the command line and is also integrated in JetBrains' AppCode integrated development environment. It installs dependencies (e.g. libraries) for an application by specification of dependencies rather than by manually copying source files. Besides installing from many different sources, a “master” spec repository—containing metadata for many open-source libraries—is maintained as a Git repository and hosted on GitHub. CocoaPods dependency resolution system is powered by Molinillo which is also used by other large projects such as Bundler, RubyGems, and Berkshelf.

== Example ==
The following Podfile example installs the AFNetworking and CocoaLumberjack libraries:

 platform :ios
 pod 'AFNetworking',    '~> 2.0.0'
 pod 'CocoaLumberjack', '< 1.7'

 target 'MyApp'

== Security ==
In July 2024, CocoaPods has been found to have multiple security vulnerabilities that could allow attackers to take control of unclaimed software packages and inject malicious code into applications. These issues have since been patched, but they exposed millions of iOS and macOS apps to supply chain attacks for an estimated period of 10 years.

== Maintenance mode ==
In August 2024 the project transitioned into maintenance mode after 13 years. With the announcement of Swift Package Manager (SPM) by Apple in 2015, maintainers' ties to the project weakened, with updates driven mostly by security fixes or Xcode compatibility issues. Despite this, CocoaPods' usage has continued due to its role in frameworks like React Native and Flutter, though many users are currently unaware of its existence or inner workings. With Apple's SPM as its successor and declining active development, the CocoaPods team is now reassessing the project's future and maintenance approach.

== See also ==
- List of build automation software
- List of software package management systems
- Xcode
- RubyGems
