= YARV =

Interpreter for the Ruby programming language

- Developer: Koichi Sasada
- Stable release: 4.0.7 / 15 September 2026; 12 days ago
- Written in: C, Ruby
- Operating system: Cross-platform
- Predecessor: Ruby MRI
- Type: Ruby Virtual Machine
- License: Ruby License
- Website: www.ruby-lang.org
- Repository: github.com/ruby/ruby

YARV (Yet another Ruby VM) is a bytecode interpreter that was developed for the Ruby programming language by Koichi Sasada. The goal of the project was to greatly reduce the execution time of Ruby programs.

Since YARV has become the official Ruby interpreter for Ruby 1.9, it is also named KRI (Koichi's Ruby Interpreter), in the same vein as the original Ruby MRI, named in honor of Ruby's creator Yukihiro Matsumoto.

== Performance ==
Benchmarks by rubychan.de showed significant increases in performance. Benchmarks by Antonio Cangiano showed speed improvements over other Ruby VMs, with 1.9 on average four times faster than the original interpreter. All evaluations comprised a mix of mostly synthetic benchmarks.

== History ==
YARV was merged into the Ruby Subversion repository on January 1, 2007. It was released as part of Ruby 1.9.0 on December 26, 2007, replacing Ruby MRI.

== See also ==
- Parrot virtual machine
- Rubinius
- Ruby programming language
