= CamelBones =

Programming framework

CamelBones is a programming framework that allows one to use Mac OS X's Cocoa API from the Perl programming language. Its main author and maintainer was Sherm Pendley, before he died in 2011. In 2004, an unfinished version was made available to the public, and in 2006, the project released version 1.0. The last version as of 2011 was 1.1.2.

As of Pendley's death in 2011, the project is currently unmaintained.
