= Ola Bini =

Swedish programmer and Internet activist

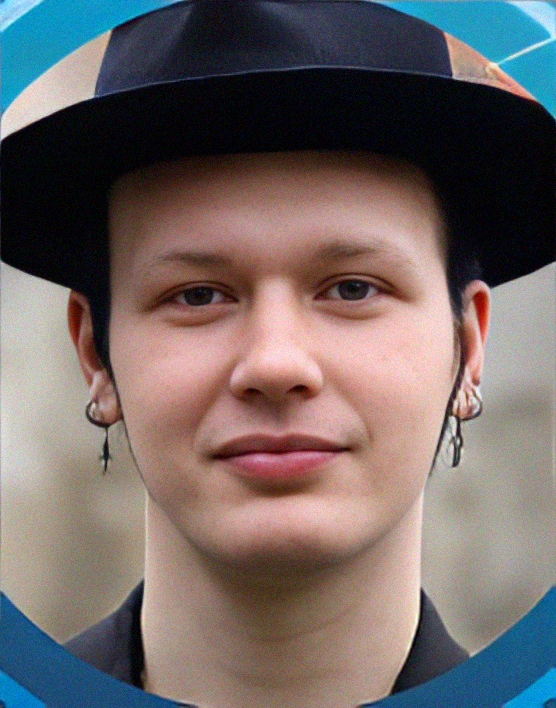
- Bini in 2014
- Born: 1982 (age 43–44); Kungälv, Gothenburg and Bohus County, Sweden
- Occupations: programmer; author; activist
- Website: https://olabini.se/

Ola Bini (born Ola Martin Gustafsson, 1982) is a Swedish programmer and Internet activist, working for the Digital Autonomy Center in Ecuador on issues of privacy, security and cryptography. He has been in Ecuador since 2013.

In April 2019, Bini was arrested in Ecuador, apparently due to his association with Julian Assange and WikiLeaks. In January 2023, Bini was acquitted of all charges.

== Work ==
Ola Bini has been involved in the design and implementation of programming languages (JRuby, Ioke, Seph). According to his website, he works on technologies to improve privacy.

=== Karolinska Institutet ===
According to his 2007 book, Ola Bini worked at the Karolinska Institutet from 2001 to 2007 as a systems developer and systems architect.

=== ThoughtWorks ===
In June 2007, Bini left the Karolinska Institutet to join ThoughtWorks for work on the Ruby programming language, including the JRuby core. That year Bini authored the book Practical JRuby on Rails Web 2.0 Projects: Bringing Ruby on Rails to Java, referencing his work for "ThoughtWorks Studios, the product development division of ThoughtWorks, Ltd." He spoke about JRuby and Ioke at Google I/O 2009. In 2011 he authored a second book about creating web development applications, Using JRuby: Bringing Ruby to Java.

The company has since described him as "the creator of programming languages Seph and Ioke", and noted him as a speaker at the Swecha Freedom Fest doing outreach to students in India. At ThoughtWorks, Bini was a co-worker of Aaron Swartz, whose loss he lamented, saying "We've spent some time together, and we work for the same company. I was hoping to one day actually be able to work on a project with him."

Bini moved to Ecuador in 2013 as part of his work doing cybersecurity consulting for ThoughtWorks, which contracted with the government of Ecuador that year to advise them on a new law affecting software development. Two weeks after his arrival, he gave a talk "Ecuador as a Privacy Paradise" at a state university event.

The Jan/April 2015 issue of LineaSur Foreign Policy Journal, published by the Ministry of Foreign Affairs and Human Mobility of Ecuador, cited an interview with Bini in shaping the government's perspective on Internet privacy policy:

With the arrival of the "Internet of things" and the accumulation of data by companies that process and resell "big data," the need for clear rules and guarantees of rights is urgent. Many Internet connected devices that are already for sale do not have the necessary securities and expose the population to technical failures, improper surveillance, and criminal acts. (See the interview with Ola Bini ["Desafíos técnicos," 2015]).

An interview of Bini with this title was published in El Ciudadano in May 2015, in which he called attention to the dangers of cars and other devices vulnerable to internet intrusion.

According to the Electronic Frontier Foundation, Bini is "a free software developer, who worked to improve the security and privacy of the Internet for all its users. He has worked on several key open source projects, including JRuby, several Ruby libraries, as well as multiple implementations of the secure and open communication protocol OTR. Ola's team at ThoughtWorks contributed to Certbot, the EFF-managed tool that has provided strong encryption for millions of websites around the world."

Bini left ThoughtWorks in 2017 and remained in Ecuador.

=== Centro de Autonomía Digital ===
Bini joined Centro de Autonomía Digital after leaving ThoughtWorks in 2017.

The Centro de Autonomía Digital, a small non-profit organization incorporated in Ecuador and Spain "with the purpose of making the internet a safer place for everyone", of which he is the technical director, published a statement in 2019 detailing his contributions and noting that he had been ranked by Computerworld as Sweden's number 6 developer (in 2008), and that he "created two programming languages" and is "a long time Free Software and privacy and transparency activist." The statement listed his contributions to loke, Seph, JesCov, JRuby, JtestR, Yecht, JvYAMLb, JvYAML-gem, RbYAML, Ribs, ActiveRecord-JDBC, Jatha, Xample, and JOpenSSL.

=== DECODE Project ===
Bini contributed to the European Union's DECODE Project, aimed at "giving people ownership of their personal data", as an advisory board member.

== Arrest in Ecuador ==
Ola Bini was arrested in an action that appeared to be coordinated with the revocation of asylum and arrest of Julian Assange, whom he counted as a personal friend and visited a dozen times during the time while he was being granted refuge in the Ecuadorian embassy. The government did not file charges, but made a statement that Bini had been arrested for an "alleged participation in the crime of assault on the integrity of computer systems" that was being investigated. The action appeared to reflect a broad repudiation of the political goals of Rafael Correa by his former Vice President Lenin Moreno: in reference to Bini's arrest, Interior Minister María Paula Romo told media "It's up to the justice system to determine if he committed a crime. But we can't allow Ecuador to become a center for piracy and spying. That period in our history is over."

The Ecuadorian president, Lenin Moreno, announced on 27 July 2018 that he had begun talks with the British authorities to withdraw the Assange asylum. On 11 April 2019, the asylum was removed and Assange was arrested. Ola Bini was arrested the same day at the Quito airport when he was preparing to board a long-scheduled flight to Japan, to which he had planned to travel for training in Bujinkan Budo Taijutsu, a martial art he had practiced since 2007.

He was initially sentenced to 90 days in prison in north Quito and his bank accounts were frozen.

The arrest came a few hours after Assange was evicted from the Ecuadorian embassy in London. Bini carried at least 30 electronic storage devices. In response defense attorney Carlos Soria told Reuters "They are trying to link him with some sort of possible espionage case without any proof or evidence. He is a personal friend of Julian Assange, he is not a member of WikiLeaks, and being friends with somebody is not a crime — neither is having computers in your home." The attorney published a more detailed list of objections.

Romo alleged that Bini had been involved in the plot with two Russian hackers and the former Foreign Minister Ricardo Patiño, who had granted asylum to Assange in 2012, asserting that Bini had travelled with the Foreign Minister to Peru, Spain, and Venezuela. Patiño responded, "The interior minister said the Swedish man that was arrested yesterday worked with me. I have never met him. Worse travelled with him. Nor do I know Russian hackers. The only Russians I know are: President Putin, the foreign minister Lavrov and the Russian ambassador." The following week Ecuador requested an Interpol Red Notice for Patiño, who fled the country after prosecutors attempted to charge him for encouraging protestors to block roads and enter public institutions the previous year.

Bini's parents, Dag Gustafsson and Görel Bini Gustafsson, said that their son had been threatened in prison and they would remain in Ecuador until he was released. They spoke at a press conference concerning his appeal and gave a half-hour interview with TeleSUR English.

Bini's lawyers lodged an appeal against his detention on the grounds that he was arrested without a warrant and no evidence of an alleged crime was provided. Bini's appeal with the Provincial Court of Pichincha was decided 2–1 against Bini on 3 May: Judge Inés Romero favored the appeal, but judges Juana Pacheco and Fabián Fabara opposed it.

On 20 June 2019, after Bini had been in prison for 70 days, the Pichincha provincial court ruled that his detention was illegal and arbitrary and granted his habeas corpus request, ordering that he be released the following day. The charge of assault on a computer system remained in place. He was required to remain in Ecuador and to attend the prosecutor's office weekly.

On 18 May the police took a server used by Bini from the offices of Telconet. The action was initially described as a seizure during a search of company offices, but the company stated that no search had occurred and that the server was handed over to police under a mutual agreement.

Sources in the Ecuadorian prosecutor's office and the United States Justice Department told Associated Press that Bini would be questioned by the United States on 27 June.

A pre-trial hearing on 16 December 2020 ruled that there was enough evidence against Bini to proceed to trial.

After several delays, judge Yadira Proaño issued on 27 June 2021, the order to begin the trial. Two weeks later, Proaño was removed from the trial after the defense alleged "procedural fraud" related to delays in the case.

The trial commenced in January 2022 with a three-day hearing. This was followed by a further session in May 2022. On 31 January 2023, Bini was acquitted of all charges.

The acquittal was subsequently overturned in a 2-1 and Bini was sentenced to 1 year in prison.

=== Reactions ===
==== Analysis and commentary ====
Bini's lawyer Carlos Soria, said the case was created to justify the removal of Assange from the embassy and to improve Moreno's public image which had been tarnished by the corruption scandal known as the INA papers.

News reports of the case have suggested that it, like the revocation of Assange's asylum, might be a response to the publication of the "INA Papers" in March 2019, which detailed offshore financial transactions of Lenin Moreno and family members. The papers, which prompted investigation by the legislature, may have been referred to by Interior Minister Romo when she claimed to have "sufficient evidence that [Bini] was collaborating in attempts to destabilize the government." The papers were published on an independent web site and were disclosed in a news story by La Fuente; Wikileaks has denied any role in obtaining or publishing the documents, and claims Assange himself was closely monitored and cut off from communication within the embassy.

An open letter from a group of concerned leading citizens, including Noam Chomsky, Pamela Anderson, and Brian Eno, was published as an editorial in Aftonbladet. It called on the Swedish government to become politically involved in the case at a level beyond ordinary consular assistance.

==== Organizations ====
The Electronic Frontier Foundation issued a statement that Ecuadorean authorities have "no reason" to detain Bini, writing that "One might expect the Ecuadorean administration to hold up Bini as an example of the high-tech promise of the country, and use his expertise to assist the new administration in securing their infrastructure — just as the European Union made use of Ola's expertise when developing its government-funded DECODE privacy project... At EFF, we are familiar with overzealous prosecutors attempting to implicate innocent coders by portraying them as dangerous cyber-masterminds, as well as demonizing the tools and lifestyle of coders that work to defend the security of critical infrastructure, not undermine it. These cases are indicative of an inappropriate tech panic, and their claims are rarely borne out by the facts."

Article 19 called for Bini's release, stating "ARTICLE 19 is concerned that the arrest and illegal detention of Ola Bini is part of a crackdown against the community of developers who build digital security technology tools which enable Internet freedoms and secure communication online." Amnesty International has also commented on his case.

A Free Ola Bini website was established, with a solidarity letter citing many supporting organizations, which urges readers to join a Code Pink campaign supporting his release.

Luis Enríquez, coordinator of the cyber-rights observatory at the Universidad Andina Simon Bolívar in Ecuador said "the Ecuadorian justice system has not acted independently".

Amnesty International said it was concerned that Bini's right to the presumption of innocence had been affected by the actions and statements of high-ranking Ecuadorian officials.

In August 2021, the organisations Access Now and the Berkman Klein Center for Internet & Society published a report into internet security that included a discussion of Bini's case. The report said the case contained irregularities and was an example of the Ecuadorian government's persecution of the internet security community.

Valeria Betancourt, from the Association for Progressive Communications, described Bini's case as the "antithesis of due process and the rule of law".

== Personal life ==
Ola Bini is a martial arts practitioner, considering himself a Shugyosha, which is someone traveling a musha shugyô. When he was detained on 11 April 2019, he was about to travel to Japan to train Shinobi no jutsu with Japanese masters. He received a brown belt for brazilian jiu-jitsu on 10 February 2023.
