= Network Applied Communication Laboratory =

Open source systems integrator

Network Applied Communication Laboratory Ltd. is an open source systems integrator located in Shimane Prefecture, Japan. It is specialized in systems consulting and the development of web sites and open source software. It is one of the employers of Yukihiro Matsumoto, who is the creator of the Ruby programming language. It is known more commonly by the acronym "NaCl".
