= RubySpec =

Specification tests for the Ruby programming language

- Written in: Ruby
- Type: Ruby programming language specifications tests

The RubySpec project aimed to write a complete executable specification for the Ruby programming language. This project contains specs that describe Ruby language syntax and standard library classes. The project contains two main components:

- the RubySpec sources
- the MSpec framework

The RubySpec test suite captured most of 1.8.6/1.8.7/1.9 behavior as a reference conformance tool. Ruby MRI 1.9.2 passed over 99% of RubySpec, while version 2.2.0 crashed on one of the tests.

== History ==
The RubySpec tests were initially created in 2006 for the Rubinius project, with significant contribution from the JRuby project. It is now used in other Ruby implementation projects such as IronRuby. The RubySpec project was discontinued at the end of 2014 due to a lack of uptake from mainstream ruby developers.

It was later revived by Benoit Daloze as "The Ruby Spec Suite", and is as of 2025-02-10 actively maintained at https://github.com/ruby/spec.
