= HotRuby =

- Written in: JavaScript and ActionScript
- Operating system: Cross-platform
- Type: Ruby programming language interpreter
- License: Ruby License, BSD License
- Website: hotruby.yukoba.jp

HotRuby is a JavaScript and ActionScript implementation of the Ruby programming language. HotRuby runs Ruby source code on a web browser and Flash.
