= RubyForge =

Software development management system

RubyForge was a collaborative software development management system dedicated to projects related to the Ruby programming language. It was started in 2003 by Ruby Central in an effort to help the Ruby community by providing a home for open source Ruby projects.

In February 2014 it hosted 9,603 projects and had 103,899 registered users.

== Shutting down ==
On 10 Nov 2013, Evan Phoenix announced, without explanation, that RubyForge would be shutting down and unavailable as of May 15 2014.

== See also ==
- Comparison of source code hosting facilities
