= Jakarta Project =

Umbrella project under the auspices of the Apache Software Foundation

The Jakarta Project created and maintained open source software for the Java platform. It operated as an umbrella project under the auspices of the Apache Software Foundation, and all Jakarta products are released under the Apache License. As of December 21, 2011 the Jakarta project was retired because no subprojects were remaining.

In 2018 Jakarta EE, a part of the Eclipse Enterprise for Java (EE4J) project, became the new name for the Java EE platform at the Eclipse Foundation.

== Subprojects ==
Major contributions by the Jakarta Project include tools, libraries and frameworks such as:

- BCEL - a Java byte code manipulation library
- BSF - a scripting framework
- Cactus - a unit testing framework for server-side Java classes
- Apache JMeter - a load- and stress-testing tool.
- Slide - a content repository primarily using WebDAV

The following projects were formerly part of Jakarta, but now form independent projects within the Apache Software Foundation:

- Ant - a build tool
- Commons - a collection of useful classes intended to complement Java's standard library.
- HiveMind - a services and configuration microkernel
- Maven - a project build and management tool
- POI - a pure Java port of Microsoft's popular file formats.
- Struts - a web application development framework
- Tapestry - A component object model based on JavaBeans properties and strong specifications
- Tomcat - a JSP/Servlet container
- Turbine - a rapid development web application framework
- Velocity - a template engine

== Project name ==
Jakarta is named after the conference room at Sun Microsystems where the majority of discussions leading to the project's creation took place. At the time, Sun's Java software division was headquartered in a Cupertino building where the conference room names were all coffee references.

== See also ==
- List of Java frameworks
