= Fat comma =

Syntactic construction in computer programming

The fat comma (also termed hash rocket in Ruby and a fat arrow in JavaScript) is a syntactic construction that appears in a position in a function call (or definition) where a comma would usually appear. The original usage refers to the ")letters:(" construction in ALGOL 60. Newer usage refers to the "=>" operator present in some programming languages. It is primarily associated with PHP, Ruby and Perl programming languages, which use it to declare hashes. Using a fat comma to bind key-value pairs in a hash, instead of using a comma, is considered an example of good idiomatic Perl. In CoffeeScript and TypeScript, the fat comma is used to declare a function that is bound to this.

# a typical, idiomatic use of the fat comma in Perl
my %hash = (
    first_name => "Larry",
    last_name  => "Wall",
);

== Subtleties ==
=== ALGOL 60 ===
The ALGOL "fat comma" is semantically identical to the comma. In particular, whether letter strings are used, and what their contents are, need not match between the definition of a function and its uses. The following are equivalent:

S(s-5, T, P)
S(s-5) t: (T) p: (P)
S(s-5) Temperature: (T) Pressure: (P)

=== Perl ===
The "fat comma" forces the word to its left to be interpreted as a string.

Thus, where this would produce a run-time error under strict (barewords are not allowed):

%bad_example = ( bad_bareword, "not so cool" );

the following use of the fat comma would be legal and idiomatic:

%good_example = ( converted_to_string => "very monkish" );

This is because the token converted_to_string would be converted to the string literal "converted_to_string" which is a legal argument in a hash key assignment. The result is easier-to-read code, with a stronger emphasis on the name-value pairing of associative arrays.

=== PHP ===
In PHP, the fat comma is termed a double arrow, and is used to specify key/value relationships when declaring an array. Unlike in Perl, the double arrow does not treat what comes before it as a bare word, but rather evaluates it. Hence, constants used with the double arrow will be evaluated:

$array = array("name" => "PHP", "influences" => array("Perl", "C", "C++", "Java", "Tcl"));

=== Ruby ===
In Ruby, the fat comma is the token to create hashes. Ruby 1.9 introduced a special syntax to use symbols as barewords. In Ruby, the fat comma is called a hash rocket.

# Old syntax
old_hash = { :name => 'Ruby', :influences => ['Perl', 'Python', 'Smalltalk'] }

# New syntax (Ruby >= 1.9)
new_hash = { name: 'Ruby', influences: ['Perl', 'Python', 'Smalltalk'] }

== Use as lambda functions ==
The fat arrow is used to declare single expression anonymous functions in JavaScript, and C sharp.
