= RubyCocoa =

MacOS framework

RubyCocoa is a macOS framework that provides a bridge between the Ruby and the Objective-C programming languages, allowing the user to manipulate Objective-C objects from Ruby, and vice versa. It makes it possible to write a Cocoa application completely in Ruby as well as to write an application that mixes Ruby and Objective-C code. An Apple project called MacRuby was under development to replace RubyCocoa in 2008. A proprietary spin-off called RubyMotion was subsequently released in 2012, available for iOS, macOS and Android.

RubyCocoa is used for exploration of a Cocoa object's features with irb interactively, prototyping of a Cocoa application, writing a Cocoa application that combines the features of Ruby and Objective-C, and wrapping macOS' native GUI for a Ruby script.

RubyCocoa is free software, released under both the Ruby License and the LGPL.

== History ==
RubyCocoa was started in 2001 by Hisakuni Fujimoto when he implemented a Ruby extension module to wrap NSObject and NSClassFromString function. Later it was integrated with Project Builder (which later became Xcode). In 2002 the project was registered on SourceForge and the development team began to grow.

In 2006 the committers list was first joined by a developer from Apple, Laurent Sansonetti, and then a RubyCocoa presentation was made during WWDC. Apple stated that RubyCocoa will be included and supported in Mac OS X v10.5 “Leopard”.

In August 2008, Sansonetti confirmed that MacRuby "is supposed to replace RubyCocoa." in the future.

== Functionality ==
RubyCocoa is sometimes interpreted as a set of bindings to the Cocoa frameworks, which is false. RubyCocoa is a real bridge between the Objective-C and Ruby programming languages.

=== Lazy class import ===
RubyCocoa will import the Objective-C classes into the Ruby world on demand. For example, when you access OSX::NSTableView for the very first time in your code, RubyCocoa will retrieve all the necessary information regarding this class from the Objective-C runtime and create a Ruby class of the same name that will act as a proxy. It will also import in the same way all the inherited classes.

=== Forwarding messages ===
Every time the user sends a Ruby message to a proxy object, RubyCocoa will try to forward it to the embedded Objective-C instance, by translating the message name to an Objective-C selector and asking the Objective-C runtime to forward it.

If an exception is raised from the Objective-C world, RubyCocoa will convert it to a Ruby exception and forward it to you.

RubyCocoa uses the libffi library to call the Objective-C methods implementations.

=== Automatic method overriding ===
RubyCocoa makes it easy to override an Objective-C method from Ruby, either in a subclass or directly to the class (as you would do in Objective-C using a category).

Once your method is inserted, RubyCocoa will retrieve the signature of the existing Objective-C method and inject a new one to the Objective-C runtime, of the same signature, but which now points to your code.

To accomplish this, RubyCocoa uses the libffi library to dynamically create a closure that will call the Ruby method, and just passes a pointer to that new closure to the Objective-C runtime.

=== Accessing the C bits ===
Due to the nature of the Objective-C language, you can freely use C from Objective-C code. In order to bridge the relevant C parts of an Objective-C framework, such as C structures, functions, enumerations, constants and more, RubyCocoa relies on the BridgeSupport project.

RubyCocoa will interpret at runtime the BridgeSupport files (using libXML2's xmlTextReader) and accordingly handle their content. It will for instance construct the Ruby proxy classes for the C structures and also create the functions.

Note that the costly operations, such as localizing the symbols, are done on demand, and obviously only once.

=== Format strings ===
RubyCocoa is able to detect APIs that use format strings, like NSLog or NSString.stringWithFormat, and appropriately convert the variable arguments to the types specified in the format string.

=== Function pointers ===
RubyCocoa allows you to pass Ruby Proc objects as function pointer arguments. It will then use the libffi library to dynamically create a closure and pass it to the underlying function/method.

== Creation of Cocoa applications written in Ruby ==
Installing RubyCocoa also automatically installs the corresponding Xcode templates. This allows developers to select "Cocoa-Ruby Application" as the Xcode project type and Xcode will generate all necessary files for them.

== How to call Objective-C methods from Ruby ==
To invoke an Objective-C method, you replace each colon in the method name except the last with an underscore. Thus, for example, the NSWindow instance method initWithContentRect:styleMask:backing:defer: becomes initWithContentRect_styleMask_backing_defer.

All Cocoa classes and functions belong to OSX module, so for example, the Objective-C code:

[[NSWindow alloc] initWithContentRect:frame
                            styleMask:NSTitledWindowMask
                              backing:NSBackingStoreBuffered
                                defer:NO]

will become:

OSX::NSWindow.alloc.initWithContentRect_styleMask_backing_defer(frame,
  OSX::NSTitledWindowMask,
  OSX::NSBackingStoreBuffered,
  false)

As you can see, this decreases the code readability by rendering Objective-C parameter naming useless. So, there is another convenient way to write the method calls — the objc_send method, which accepts Ruby symbols as parameter names. For example, the previous code can also be written as:

OSX::NSWindow.alloc.objc_send(:initWithContentRect, frame,
  :styleMask, OSX::NSTitledWindowMask,
  :backing, OSX::NSBackingStoreBuffered,
  :defer, false)

== Advantages of RubyCocoa ==
- As Ruby is an interpreted language, there's no need to recompile the application frequently during development.
- Some of Ruby's rich features, like built-in regular expression support, make writing the code faster, and also make RubyCocoa an ideal tool for prototyping.

== Disadvantages ==
- Ignoring the speed of the Ruby interpreter, RubyCocoa applications will always be slower than Objective-C/Cocoa applications due to the added overhead of object conversion.
- Because Ruby isn't thread-safe, it isn't possible to dispatch multiple native threads to execute RubyCocoa code. Ruby's emulated threads, however, can be used.
