= Syntactic noise =

Syntax that makes a programming language less human readable

In computer science, syntactic noise is syntax within a programming language that makes the programming language more difficult to read and understand for humans and it is considered a code smell. It fills the language with excessive clutter that makes it a hassle to write code. Syntactic noise is considered to be the opposite of syntactic sugar, which is syntax that makes a programming language more readable and enjoyable for the programmer.
