= RubyMotion =

IDE of the Ruby programming language

- Developer: HipByte
- Written in: C, C++, Objective-C, Java, Ruby
- Operating system: Mac OS X, iOS, Android
- Type: Ruby programming language runtime and compiler
- License: Proprietary EULA
- Website: www.rubymotion.com

RubyMotion is an IDE of the Ruby programming language that supports iOS, OS X and Android. RubyMotion is a commercial product created by Laurent Sansonetti for HipByte and is based on MacRuby for OS X. RubyMotion adapted and extended MacRuby to work on platforms beyond OS X.

RubyMotion apps execute in an iOS simulator alongside a read–eval–print loop (REPL) for interactive inspection and modification. 3rd-party Objective-C libraries can be included in a RubyMotion project, either manually or by using a package manager such as CocoaPods. Programs are statically compiled into machine code by use of Rake as its build and execution tool.

RubyMotion projects can be developed with any text editor. The RubyMine IDE provides support for the RubyMotion toolchain, such as code-completion and visual debugging.

As of version 2.0, RubyMotion now supports the development of applications for OS X in addition to iOS. Android support was added in version 3.0.

Examples of applications built in RubyMotion include 37signals's Basecamp for iPhone, the Bandcamp iPhone app, and A Dark Room for iOS.

== See also ==
- mruby – another minimal Ruby implementation, targeted at embedded devices, that could be compiled to native code
