= Fluent Bit =

- Developer: Fluentd Project
- Written in: C
- Type: Logging
- License: Apache License
- Website: fluentbit.io
- Repository: github.com/fluent/fluent-bit

Fluent Bit (styled as fluentbit) is a software project for logging. It is commonly utilized in Kubernetes clusters.

In November 2025, researchers at Oligo Security disclosed five vulnerabilities in Fluent Bit, including issues that could enable authentication bypass, log manipulation, denial-of-service attacks, and, in some configurations, remote code execution.
