= Ruby MRI =

Interpreter for the Ruby programming language

Ruby
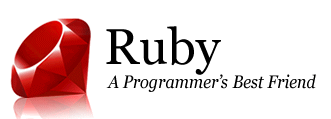
- Developer: Yukihiro Matsumoto (among others)
- Release: August 4, 2003; 23 years ago
- Final release: 1.8.7 / May 31, 2008; 18 years ago
- Written in: C
- Operating system: Cross-platform
- Successor: YARV
- Type: Ruby programming language interpreter
- License: Ruby License; Simplified BSD License; GNU General Public License (prior to 1.9.3)
- Website: www.ruby-lang.org
- Repository: git.ruby-lang.org/ruby.git

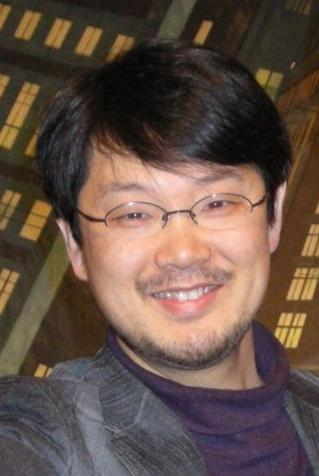
Yukihiro Matsumoto, the creator of Ruby.

Matz's Ruby Interpreter or Ruby MRI (also called CRuby) is an implementation of the Ruby programming language named after Ruby creator Yukihiro Matsumoto ("Matz"). Until the specification of the Ruby language in 2012, the MRI implementation was considered the de facto reference. Starting with Ruby 1.9, and continuing with Ruby 2.x and above, the official Ruby interpreter has been YARV ("Yet Another Ruby VM").

Ruby 1.8 is the last version that uses MRI.

== History ==
Yukihiro Matsumoto ("Matz") started working on Ruby on February 24, 1993, and released it to the public in 1995. "Ruby" was named as a gemstone because of a joke within Matsumoto's circle of friends alluding to the name of the Perl programming language.

The 1.8 branch has been maintained until June 2013, and 1.8.7 releases have been released since April 2008. This version provides bug fixes, but also many Ruby feature enhancements.

The RubySpec project (later renamed to "The Ruby Spec Suite") has independently created a large test suite that captures Ruby behavior as a reference conformance tool. Ruby MRI 1.9.2 passed over 99% of RubySpec., MRI Ruby 2.2 crashed on one of the tests.

== Licensing terms ==
Prior to release 1.9.3, the Ruby interpreter and libraries were distributed as dual-licensed free and open source software, under the GNU General Public License or the Ruby License. In release 1.9.3, Ruby's License has been changed from a dual license with GPLv2 to a dual license with the 2-clause BSD license.

== Operating systems ==
Ruby MRI is available for the following operating systems (supported Ruby versions can be different):

- Acorn RISC OS
- Amiga
- BeOS / Haiku
- MS-DOS
- IBM i
- Internet Tablet OS
- Linux
- OS X
- Windows
- Windows CE
- MorphOS
- OS/2
- OpenVMS
- Syllable
- Symbian OS
- Blue Gene/L compute node kernel
- Unix

This list may not be exhaustive.

PowerPC64 performance
Since version 2.2.1, Ruby MRI performance on PowerPC64 was improved.

== Limitations ==
Commonly noted limitations include:

Backward compatibility
Version 1.9 and 1.8 have slight semantic differences. The release of Ruby 2.0 sought to avoid such a conflict between different versions.

Threaded programs cannot use more than a single CPU core due to the Global interpreter lock.

== See also ==
- YARV
