= Yukihiro Matsumoto =

Japanese computer scientist (born 1965)

- まつもと ゆきひろ (Japanese)
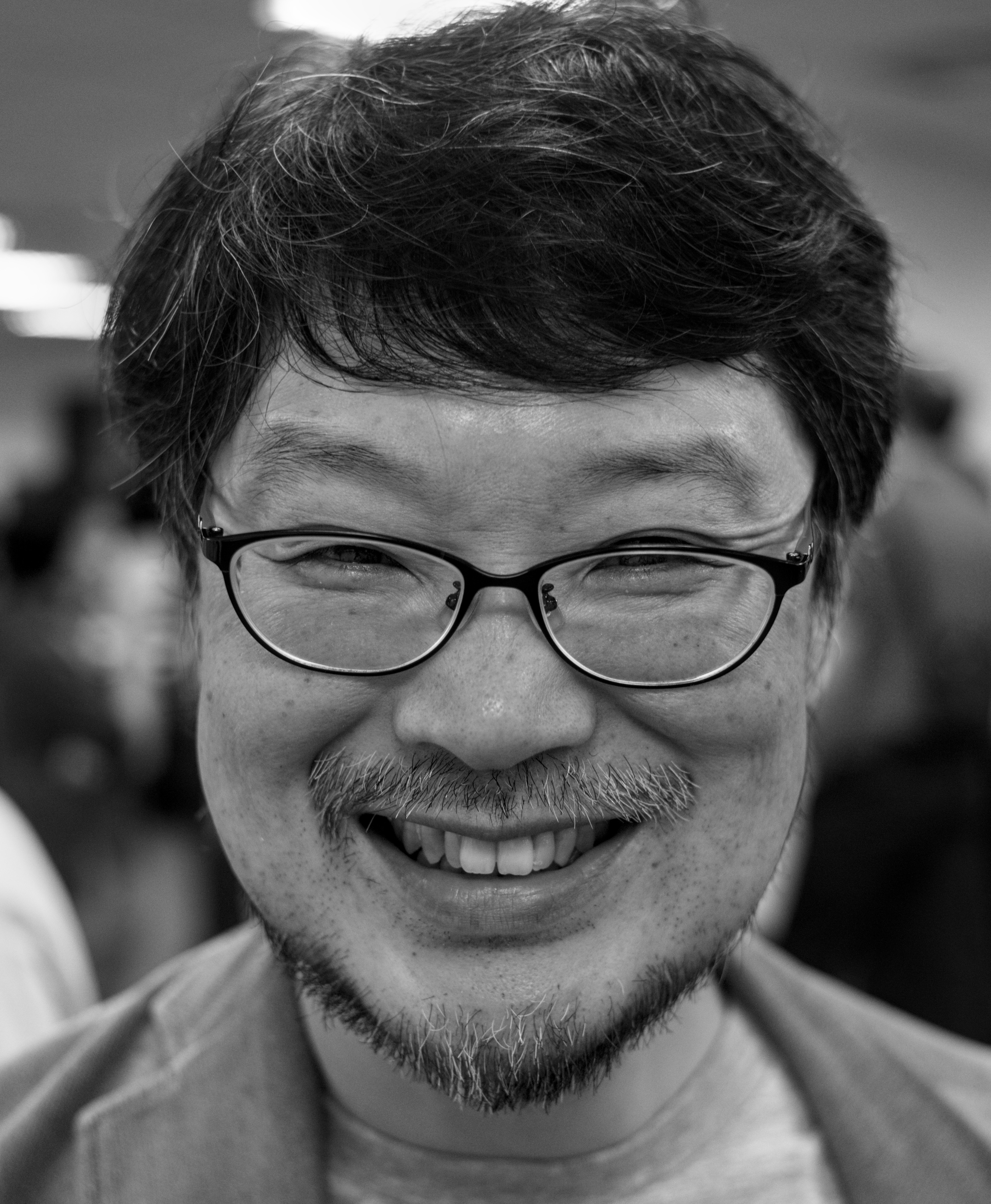
- Yukihiro Matsumoto in 2018
- Born: 14 April 1965 (age 61); Osaka Prefecture, Japan
- Other name: Matz
- Education: University of Tsukuba (BS); Shimane University
- Occupations: Computer scientist, programmer, author
- Known for: Ruby
- Children: 4

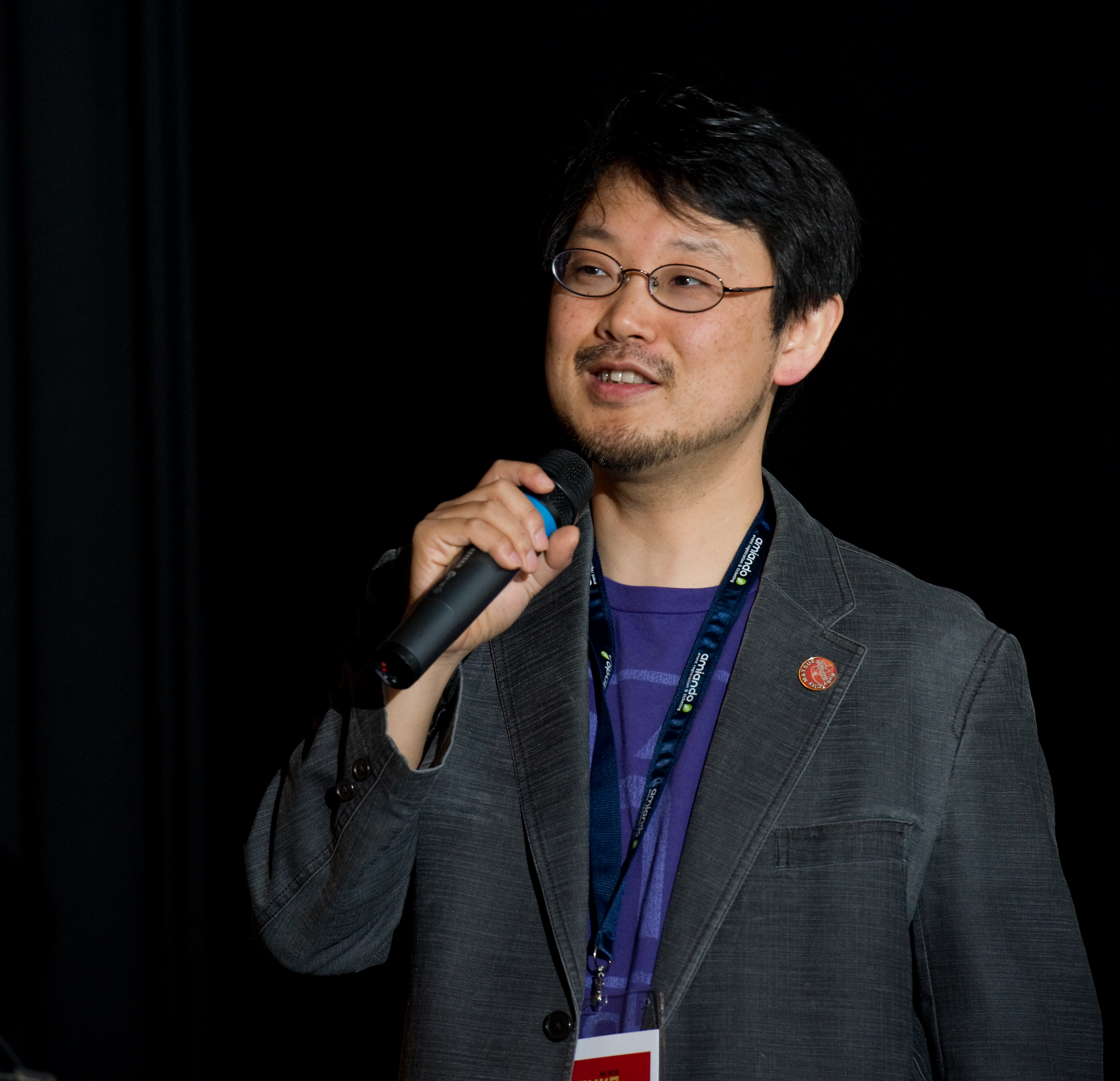
Matsumoto giving the keynote speech at EuRuKo 2011

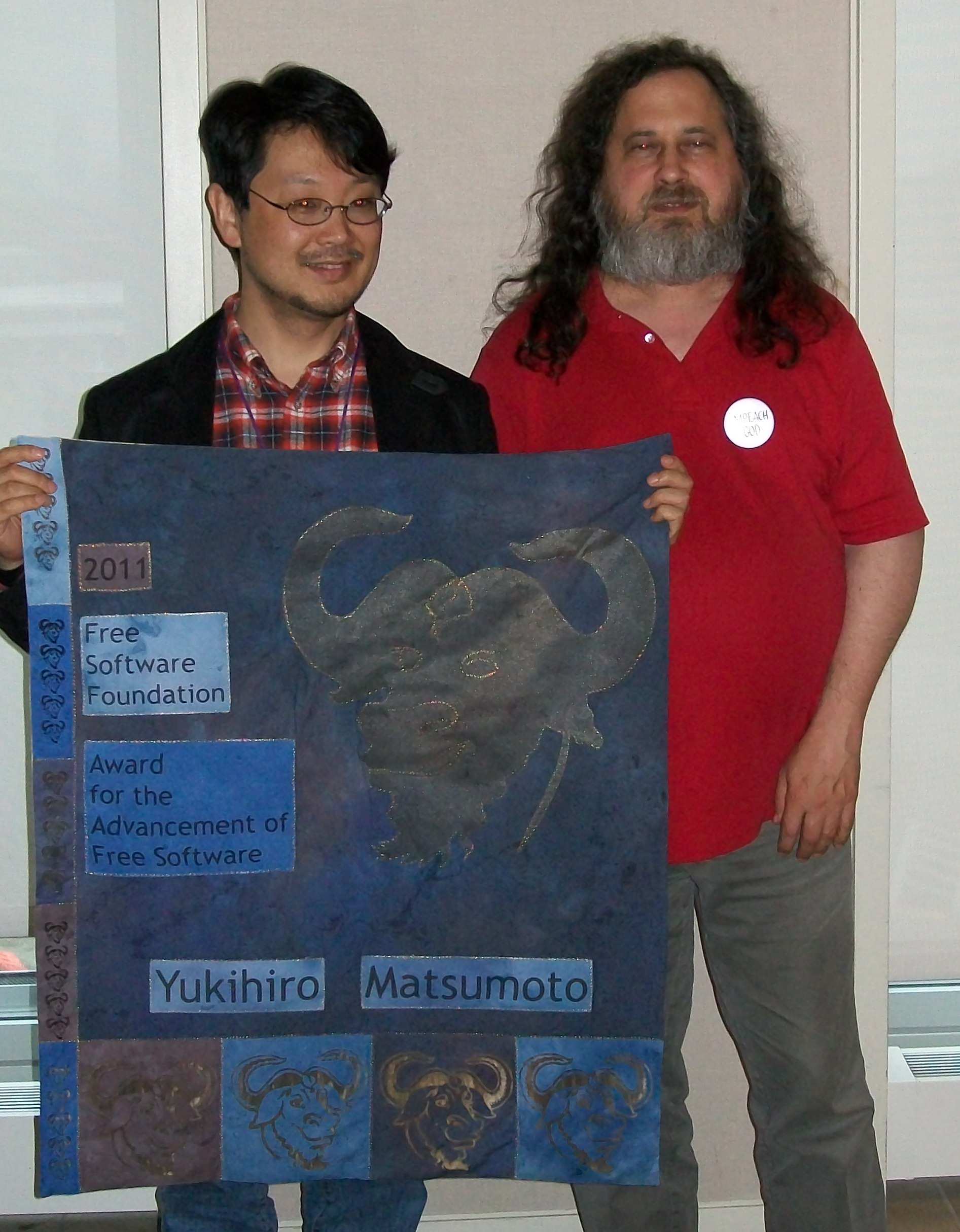
Matsumoto accepting an award from the Free Software Foundation (founder Richard Stallman, right) in 2012

Yukihiro Matsumoto (まつもとゆきひろ, Matsumoto Yukihiro; born 14 April 1965), also known as Matz, is a Japanese computer scientist and software programmer. He is best known as the chief designer of the Ruby programming language and its original reference implementation, Matz's Ruby Interpreter (MRI).

As of 2011, Matsumoto is the Chief Architect of Ruby at Heroku, an online cloud platform-as-a-service in San Francisco. He is a fellow of the Rakuten Institute of Technology, a research and development organization within Rakuten Group, Inc. He was appointed to the role of technical advisor for VASILY, Inc. starting in June 2014.

== Early life ==
Born in Osaka Prefecture, Japan, he was raised in Tottori from the age of four. According to an interview conducted by Japan Inc., he was a self-taught programmer until the end of high school. He graduated with an information science degree from University of Tsukuba where he was a member of Ikuo Nakata's research lab on programming languages and compilers.

== Work ==
He works for the Japanese open source company Netlab.jp. Matsumoto is known as one of the open-source evangelists in Japan. He has released several open source products, including cmail, the Emacs-based mail user agent, written entirely in Emacs Lisp. Ruby is his first piece of software that became known outside Japan.

=== Ruby ===
Matsumoto released the first version of the Ruby programming language on 21 December 1995. He still leads the development of the language's reference implementation, MRI (Matz's Ruby Interpreter).

=== mruby ===
In April 2012, Matsumoto open sourced his work on a new implementation of Ruby called mruby. It is a minimal implementation based on his virtual machine, ritevm, and is designed to allow software developers to embed Ruby in other programs while keeping memory footprint small and performance optimized.

=== streem ===
In December 2014, Matsumoto open sourced his work on a new scripting language called streem, a concurrent language based on a programming model similar to shell, with influences from Ruby, Erlang, and other functional programming languages.

=== Treasure Data ===
Matsumoto has been listed as an investor for Treasure Data; many of the company's programs such as Fluentd use Ruby as their primary language.

== Recognition ==
Matsumoto received the 2011 Award for the Advancement of Free Software from the Free Software Foundation (FSF) at the 2012 LibrePlanet conference at the University of Massachusetts Boston in Boston.

== Personal life ==
Matsumoto is married and has four children. He is a member of the Church of Jesus Christ of Latter-day Saints, having served a full time mission in the Japan Okayama mission, he currently serves as a counselor in the bishopric of his church's ward.

== Written works ==
- オブジェクト指向スクリプト言語 Ruby ISBN 4-756-13254-5
- Ruby in a Nutshell ISBN 0-596-00214-9
- The Ruby Programming Language

== See also ==
- Ruby (programming language)
- Ruby MRI
- Ruby on Rails
