= Scripting for the Java Platform =

Scripting for the Java Platform is a framework for embedding scripts into Java source code.

There is no requirement for a given Java virtual machine (JVM) to include any JavaScript engine by default, but the Oracle JVM (Java 6 and later) included a JavaScript engine, based on Rhino version 1.6R2 before Java 8, and Nashorn since Java 8.

Nashorn was deprecated in Java 11 and was officially removed from the JDK in Java 15.

Scripting for the Java Platform was developed under the Java Community Process as JSR 223. The final release of JSR 223 happened on December 11, 2006. The specification, however, was withdrawn later on December 13, 2016 after a Maintenance Review Ballot, where it was decided that the javax.script API would be included as an integral part of Java 9 and onward.

== See also ==
- Da Vinci Machine
- Groovy
- List of JVM languages
- Apache JMeter

== Bibliography ==
- Bosanac, Dejan (August 19, 2007), Scripting in Java: Languages, Frameworks, and Patterns (1st ed.), Addison-Wesley Professional, p. 552, ISBN 978-0-321-32193-0
