= MacRuby =

- Developer(s): Laurent Sansonetti (Apple Inc.)
- Final release: 0.12 / June 11, 2012; 13 years ago
- Repository: github.com/MacRuby/MacRuby
- Written in: C, C++, Objective-C
- Operating system: Mac OS X
- Type: Ruby programming language interpreter and compiler
- License: Ruby License
- Website: www.macruby.org

MacRuby is a discontinued implementation of the Ruby language that ran on the Objective-C runtime and CoreFoundation framework under development by Apple Inc. which "was supposed to replace RubyCocoa". It targeted Ruby 1.9 and used the high performance LLVM compiler infrastructure starting with version 0.5. It supports both ahead-of-time and just-in-time compilation.

MacRuby supported Interface Builder and shipped with a core library called HotCocoa to simplify Cocoa programming. MacRuby was also used as an embedded scripting language for Objective-C applications.

In May 2012, Laurent Sansonetti announced RubyMotion, a port of MacRuby for iOS, OS X and Android.

Development on MacRuby effectively ended in late 2011, coinciding with the principal author's departure from Apple Inc. As of Jan 5 2015, The MacRuby project is no longer under active development; MacRuby does not work on Mavericks, the team having shifted their focus to a commercial RubyMotion product for iOS and OS X.

== History ==
MacRuby was originally called "ruby+objc" and was developed by Laurent Sansonetti, who began work on it in late 2007. In March 2008, the first publicly available version, MacRuby 0.1, was announced on the official RubyTalk forum. Version 0.2 was released in June 2008, and implemented Ruby strings, arrays and hashes as native Cocoa types. In September 2008, MacRuby 0.3 was released and included the HotCocoa library as well as several HotCocoa example programs. In October 2008, Apple created its first MacRuby page on its Developer Connection website.

MacRuby 0.4 was released in March 2009, MacRuby 0.5, 0.6, 0.7 in January, May and October 2010 respectively. MacRuby 0.8, was released on December 13, 2010, 0.9 on February 25, 2011 0.10 on March 23, 2011, 0.11 on October 17, 2011, 0.12 on June 11, 2012.

== See also ==
- F-Script
- Nu
