= Mruby =

Lightweight Ruby language implementation

mruby
- Developer: Yukihiro Matsumoto et al.
- Initial release: April 20, 2012; 14 years ago
- Stable release: 4.0.0 / 20 April 2026; 52 days ago
- Written in: C and Ruby
- Operating system: Cross-platform
- Standard: ISO/IEC 30170:2012
- Type: Ruby programming language interpreter
- License: MIT License
- Website: mruby.org
- Repository: github.com/mruby/mruby

mruby is an interpreter for the Ruby programming language with the intention of being lightweight and easily embeddable. The project is headed by Yukihiro Matsumoto, with over 100 contributors currently working on the project.

== Features ==
mruby 1.0 supports the Ruby 2.1 core API, but none of the standard library. As well as being able to execute most basic Ruby code, mruby also features a bytecode compiler and virtual machine, as well as the ability to be easily embedded and integrated into C or C++ code, in a similar manner to Lua or Tcl.

mruby 2.0.0 adds support for several Ruby 2.x methods beyond Ruby 2.1. v2.0.0 also changed to variable length bytecode instructions format.

mruby bytecode can be embedded in C code, and thus, can be compiled into a standalone executable.

mruby also aims to be compliant with the ISO/IEC 30170:2012 standard.

== Examples ==
=== Calling mruby from C ===
#include <stdio.h>
#include <mruby.h>
#include <mruby/compile.h>

int main(void) {
    mrb_state *mrb = mrb_open();
    char code[] = "5.times { puts 'mruby is awesome!' }";

    printf("Executing Ruby code with mruby:\n");
    mrb_load_string(mrb, code);

    mrb_close(mrb);
    return 0;
}

Assuming that the mruby library and headers are installed, the program can be compiled and executed by running the following commands from the terminal:

$ cc example.c -lmruby -lm -o example
$ ./example

=== Precompiled Bytecode ===
mruby includes a minimalistic virtual machine used to execute mruby bytecode, nicknamed RiteVM:

$ mrbc test.rb
$ mruby -b test.mrb

The first command compiles Ruby code to mruby bytecode, creating a file called "test.mrb", which can then be executed by appending the "-b" flag to the normal interpreter arguments.
