= Maxine Virtual Machine =

Open source software

Maxine
- Original authors: Bernd Mathiske, Douglas Simon (Sun Labs, Oracle)
- Developers: University of Manchester, Maxine team
- Initial release: 2005; 21 years ago
- Stable release: 2.9.0 / December 20, 2019; 6 years ago
- Written in: Java
- Operating system: Solaris, Linux, macOS
- Platform: x64, ARM32, AArch64, RISC-V
- Type: Java virtual machine
- License: GPL version 2.0
- Website: github.com/beehive-lab/Maxine-VM
- Repository: github.com/beehive-lab/Maxine-VM

The Maxine virtual machine is an open source virtual machine that is developed at the University of Manchester. It was formerly developed by Sun Microsystems Laboratories, since renamed Oracle Labs. The emphasis in Maxine's software architecture is on modular design and code reuse for flexibility, configurability, and productivity for industrial and academic virtual machine researchers. It is one of a growing number of Java virtual machines written entirely in Java in a meta-circular style. Examples include Squawk and Jikes RVM.

== Architecture ==
The Maxine VM is characterized internally by aggressive use of advanced language features in Java 1.5 and 1.6, by modular subsystems coordinated through Java interfaces, by the absence of an interpreter, and by a tightly coupled debugger and visualization tool for VM development.

== Compatibility ==
Maxine is plug compatible with an unmodified Java Development Kit (JDK). Maxine can be developed, built, and run in standard Java integrated development environments (IDEs), including NetBeans, Eclipse, and IntelliJ IDEA.

== Systems programming in Java ==
A secondary goal of the project is to develop methods and tools for "systems programming in Java". Compiler extensions, configured in VM source code using Java annotations, allow use, with no performance penalty, of low-level operations otherwise disallowed in Java. These extensions provided the foundation for the Graal compiler.

== The Maxine Inspector ==
Specialized debugging support for the Maxine VM is provided by the Maxine Inspector: a companion tool that acts as a combined object, class, and method browser, and as a machine- and bytecode-level debugger. The Inspector runs out-of-process, needs no active VM support, and leverages code shared with the VM for specialized developer services that exploit detailed knowledge of memory layout and VM design. Notable services include:

- multiple mode views of code (source, bytecode, disassembled machine code) with multi-mode breakpoints and stepping;
- thread, stack, register, and thread local variable inspection;
- flexible low-level memory visualization with dynamic interpretation and linking of memory values, e.g. as code locations, object references;
- dynamic visualization of object fields and metadata;
- boot image configuration details; and
- specialized algorithm-specific support for debugging during GC.

== History ==
Maxine was created by Bernd Mathiske at Sun Labs in early 2005. He led its development among a growing team until late 2008 when he left Sun Microsystems and handed the project over to Doug Simon who had been the first engineer to join it. Doug Simon continued in this role throughout the acquisition of Sun by Oracle Corporation.

The static (heap inspection) version of the Maxine Inspector was created by Bernd Mathiske in 2006. Michael Van De Vanter assumed development of the Inspector in 2007, adding dynamic support as the VM became executable and continued to evolve throughout the acquisition of Sun by Oracle Corporation.

Oracle continued development of Maxine until the release of Maxine 2.0. The University of Manchester is developing Maxine as of release 2.1.

== See also ==
- List of Java virtual machines
- Squawk virtual machine
- Jikes RVM
