= Plotkin =

Plotkin (Russian: Плоткин) is a surname of Russian Jewish origin, which indicates a person from Plotki, a name of several villages in Russia, Belarus, and Ukraine. It may also refer to:

- Alice Playten (1947–2011), born Alice Plotkin, American actress and singer
- Andrew Plotkin (born 1970), American writer
- Brian Plotkin (born 1984), American soccer player
- Chuck Plotkin, American record producer
- Diana Plotkin, American political activist
- Faith Plotkin (born 1947), American writer
- Gabriel Plotkin, Melvin Capital CEO
- Gordon Plotkin (born 1946), British computer scientist
- Gregory Plotkin, American film editor and director
- Hal Plotkin (born 1957), American journalist and public servant
- James Plotkin (born 1970), American guitarist
- Joshua B. Plotkin, Evolutionary biologist and applied mathematician
- Mark Plotkin (born 1955), American botanist
- Mark Plotkin (born 1998), Canadian chess player
- Stanley Plotkin (born 1932), American physician, vaccinologist, and immunologist
- Tom Plotkin, American actor

== See also ==
- Plotkin bound, a mathematical limit in coding theory
- 14619 Plotkin, asteroid
- Płotka
