= Lispkit Lisp =

- Paradigm: pure functional
- Family: Lisp
- Designed by: Peter Henderson
- First appeared: 1980; 46 years ago
- Scope: lexical
- Implementation language: ALGOL

Influenced by
- ALGOL, Lisp

Lispkit Lisp is a lexically scoped, purely functional subset of Lisp (Pure Lisp) developed as a testbed for functional programming concepts. It was first used for early experimentation with lazy evaluation. An implementation based on a stack, environment, control, dump virtual machine and abstract machine (SECD machine) written in an ALGOL variant was published by the developer Peter Henderson in 1980. The compiler and virtual machine are highly portable and as a result have been implemented on many machines.

== Base language ==
The base language provides the following functions only but extensions are discussed in Henderson's book for the explicit support of lazy evaluation and nondeterministic programming.

atom – given an expression returns True if its value is atomic; False if not
add – given two expressions returns the sum of their numeric values
car – given an expression whose value is a pair, returns the pair's first value
cdr – given an expression whose value is a pair, returns the pair's second value
cons – given two expressions returns a value pair consisting of their values
div – given two expressions returns the quotient of their numeric values
eq – given two expressions returns True if their values are equal; False if not
if – given three expressions returns the value of the second if the value of the first is True, otherwise returns the value of the third
lambda – given an argument list and an expression, returns them as a function
let – given an expression with declarations (as named expressions visible in the expression) returns its value
letrec – like let, except the declared names are also visible in the declarations themselves
leq – given two expressions, returns True if the value of the first is numerically less than or equal to the value of the second; False if not
mod (or rem) – given two expressions, returns the modulus (also known as the remainder) of their numeric values
mul – given two expressions, returns the product of their numeric values
quote – given an expression, returns that expression as a value
sub – given two expressions, returns the difference of their numeric values

The functions, lambda, let, and letrec, are similar but have subtle differences in the way that they treat named variables which make them useful in different ways: lambda defines and returns a function, let binds expressions to variable names, and letrec is essentially similar to let except it allows defining of recursive functions and values, e.g., infinite series.
