= CEK =

CEK may refer to:

- College of Engineering, Karunagappally, a Government Engineering College in Kollam district of Kerala, India
- Cek (Quba), a village in the Quba Rayon of Azerbaijan
- Chelyabinsk Airport, in Russia
- Eastern Khumi language (ISO 639-3: cek), Kukish language of Burma
- Cek dialect, a dialect of the Kryts language, a Samur language of Azerbaijan
- Content encryption key, a cryptographic key type
- CEK Machine, theoretical computer model
- Özgür Çek (born 1991), Turkish footballer
