= Mika (disambiguation) =

Mika is a unisex given name, a nickname and a surname. It may also refer to:

- Mika, Masovian Voivodeship, a village in Poland
- FC Mika, a defunct Armenian football team
- Mika Stadium, a football stadium in Yerevan, Armenia, former home ground for FC Mika
- Mika VM, open-source Java VM for embedded use
- BLS RABe 528 electric multiple units of BLS, niknamed MIKA

== See also ==
- Myka (disambiguation)
