= TakaTuka =

- Developers: University of Freiburg, LUMS
- Written in: Java, C, nesC
- Operating system: Unix-like and TinyOS
- Type: Java Virtual Machine
- License: GNU General Public License
- Website: takatuka.sourceforge.net
- Repository: sourceforge.net/p/takatuka/code/

TakaTuka is a Java virtual machine (JVM) mainly focused on wireless sensor network devices. The VM focussed on supporting small devices with at least 4 KiB of RAM and greater than 48 KiB of flash memory. TakaTuka currently offers CLDC compatible library support.

TakaTuka was developed by University of Freiburg and first went public on SourceForge in 2009. It was created to reduce the learning time of developing wireless sensor network applications by introducing a common Java language among all supported mote.

TakaTuka stores Java Class files into a highly compact format named Tuk. This format strips all unnecessary information, such as class names and retains only essential information for runtime. It also shares a similar Split VM architecture with Squawk virtual machine. Furthermore, TakaTuka also employs extensive bytecode compaction that results in smaller code size and faster bytecode execution.

== Supported motes ==
- Crossbow IRIS
- Crossbow MICA2/MICAz
- Crossbow TelosB
- Sentilla JCreate

== See also ==
- List of Java virtual machines
- TinyOS
