= Płotka =

Płotka or Plotka is a Polish surname. Notable people with the surname include:

- Michał Płotka (born 1988), Polish footballer
- Wolfgang Plotka (born 1941), German ice hockey player

== See also ==
- Płotkowo
- Plotkin
