= Kaffe =

Java virtual machine

- Original authors: Tim Wilkinson; Peter Mehlitz
- Developer: Transvirtual Technologies
- Release: 1996; 30 years ago
- Final release: 1.1.9 / 22 February 2008
- Preview release: 1.1.10-pre / 22 August 2011
- Written in: C and Java
- Operating system: Unix-like
- Type: Java Virtual Machine
- License: GPL-2.0-only
- Website: www.kaffe.org
- Repository: github.com/kaffe/kaffe

Kaffe is a discontinued "clean room design" (reverse engineering) version of a Java Virtual Machine. It comes with a subset of the Java Platform, Standard Edition (Java SE), Java API, and tools needed to provide a Java runtime environment. Like most other virtual machines implementing Free Java, Kaffe uses GNU Classpath as its class library.

Initially developed as part of another project, developers Tim Wilkinson and Peter Mehlitz founded Transvirtual Technologies, Inc. In July 1998, Transvirtual released Kaffe OpenVM under a GNU General Public License.

When compared to the reference implementation of the Java Virtual Machine written by Sun Microsystems. It comes with just-in-time compilers for many of the CPU architectures, and has been ported to more than 70 system platforms in total.

Unlike other implementations, in the past Kaffe used GNU Multi-Precision Library (GMP) to support arbitrary precision arithmetic. This feature has been removed from release 1.1.9. The capability was removed to reduce the maintenance work, expecting that people will integrate GMP support into GNU Classpath or OpenJDK. Subsequently, GNU Classpath introduced GMP support in version 0.98.

== See also ==
- List of Java virtual machines
- GNU Classpath
- Free Java implementations
