= Sun SPOT =

Wireless network sensor node

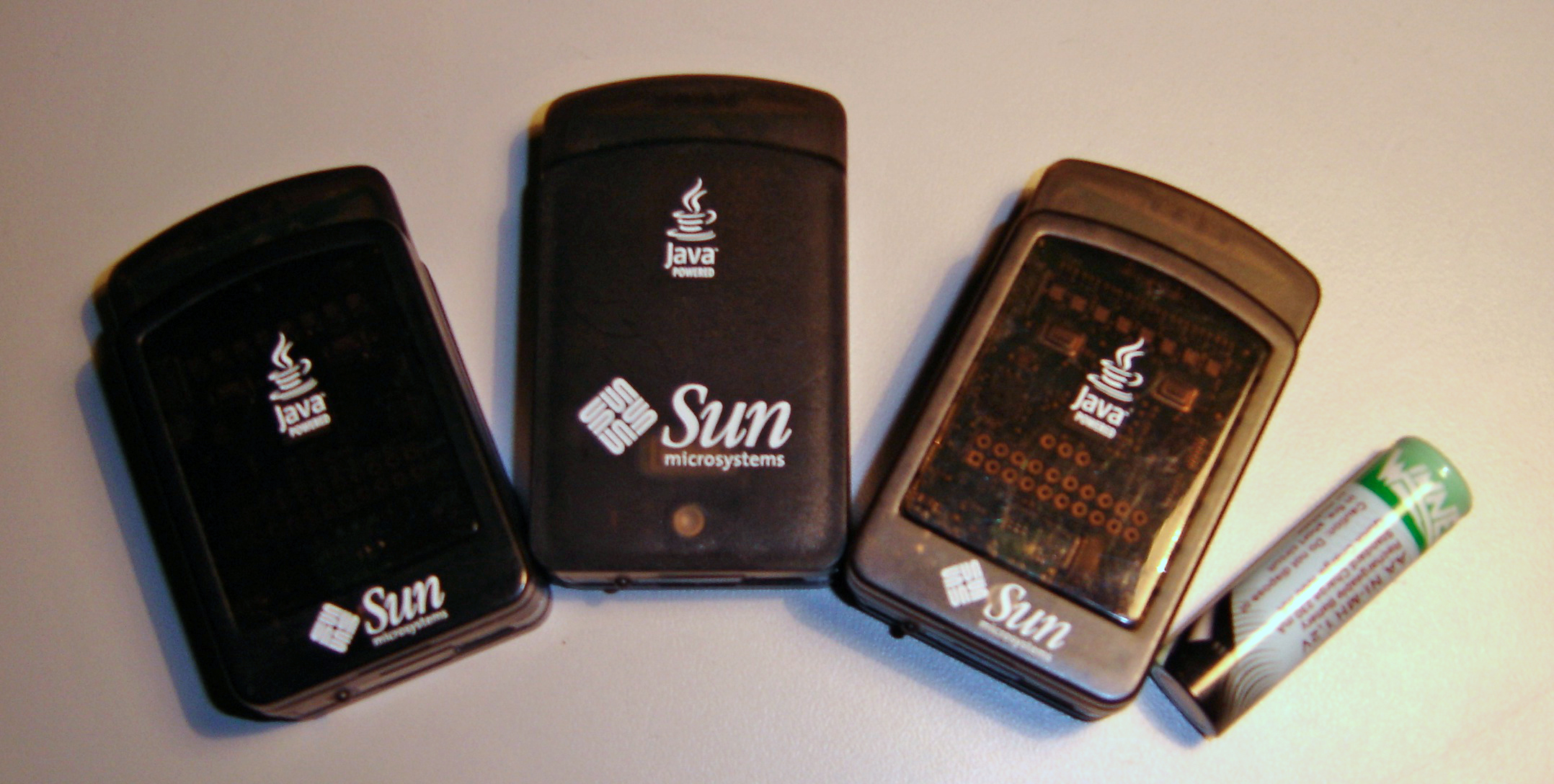
Sun SPOTs beside an AA battery

Sun SPOT (Sun Small Programmable Object Technology) was a sensor node for a wireless sensor network developed by Sun Microsystems announced in 2007. The device used the IEEE 802.15.4 standard for its networking, and unlike other available sensor nodes, used the Squawk Java virtual machine.

After the acquisition of Sun Microsystems by Oracle Corporation, the SunSPOT platform was supported but its forum was shut down in 2012. A mirror of the old site is maintained for posterity.

== Hardware ==
The completely assembled device fit in the palm of a hand.

Its first processor board included an ARM architecture 32 bit CPU with ARM920T core running at 180 MHz. It had 512 KB RAM and 4 MB flash memory. A 2.4 GHz IEEE 802.15.4 radio had an integrated antenna and a USB interface was included.

A sensor board included a three-axis accelerometer (with 2G and 6G range settings), temperature sensor, light sensor, 8 tri-color LEDs, analog and digital inputs, two momentary switches, and 4 high current output pins.

The unit used a 3.7V rechargeable 750 mAh lithium-ion battery, had a 30 uA deep sleep mode, and battery management provided by software.

== Software ==
The device's use of Java device drivers is unusual since Java is generally hardware-independent. Sun SPOT uses a small Java ME Squawk which ran directly on the processor without an operating system. Both the Squawk VM and the Sun SPOT code are open source. Standard Java development environments such as NetBeans can be used to create SunSPOT applications. The management and deployment of application are handled by ant scripts, which can be called from a development environment, command line, or the tool provided with the SPOT SDK, "solarium".

The nodes communicate using the IEEE 802.15.4 standard including the base-station approach to sensor networking. Protocols such as Zigbee can be built on 802.15.4. Sun Labs reported implementations of RSA and elliptic curve cryptography (ECC) optimized for small embedded devices.

== Availability ==
Sun Microsystems Laboratories started research on sensor networks around 2004. After some initial experience using "Motes" from Crossbow Technology, a project began under Roger Meike to design an integrated hardware and software system. Sun sponsored a project at the Art Center College of Design called Autonomous Light Air Vessels in 2005. The first limited-production run of Sun SPOT development kits were released April 2, 2007, after months of delays. This introduction kit included two Sun SPOT demo sensor boards, a Sun SPOT base station, the software development tools, and a USB cable. The software was compatible with Windows XP, Mac OS X 10.4, and common Linux distributions. Some demonstration code was provided.

A developer from Sun gave a demonstration in September 2007. After investigating commercial use, Sun moved to focus on educational users. The entire project, hardware, operating environment, Java virtual machine, drivers and applications, was available as open source in January 2008.

Oracle Corporation acquired Sun Microsystems in 2010 and continued Sun SPOT development, through release 8 of the hardware (with Sun-Oracle logo) by March 2011. The 2011 version included larger memories and a faster processor, but with fewer inputs.

In 2012 the forum said it would be "down for maintenance" until "mid-June". A new forum was started on the Oracle Technology Network on May 7, 2013. David G. Simmons, one of the SunSPOT developers for Sun Microsystems, maintained a blog through the end of 2010. He opened an alternative developers forum in July 2013 not connected to Oracle.

When the project was shut down, the lead hardware engineer for the SunSPOT project, Bob Alkire, archived the hardware design on his personal website.
