= Wonka VM =

Wonka
- Initial release: October 2001; 23 years ago
- Final release: 0.9.6
- License: BSD-style licence
- Website: wonka.sdf-eu.org

The Wonka VM is an open-source, portable, embedded implementation of the Java virtual machine specification, together with class libraries which implement most of the Connected Device Configuration of Java ME, version 1.0. The VM itself was developed independently of any other implementation, including Sun Microsystem's RI. The same is true of most of the class libraries, but in this case some code is drawn from the GNU Classpath project.

The Wonka VM was developed by telematics company Acunia to run on its ARM-based hardware. In October 2001 Wonka was released as open source software under a "revised" BSD license. Since the demise of Acunia the Wonka VM website has been hosted by software house Luminis at wonka-vm.org; however the code is no longer under active development, Wonka having effectively been superseded by the Mika VM. Nonetheless, there are still many instances of Wonka in daily use, for example in Punch Telematix' CarCube or Kronos' HirePort recruitment terminal.

== See also ==
- Mika VM
- List of Java virtual machines
