= Beverly Wilshire Homes Association =

The Beverly Wilshire Homes Association is a 501(c)4 nonprofit organization in the Fairfax District of Los Angeles that was instrumental in launching the 1978 California tax-reform initiative Proposition 13 and has played an ongoing role in anti-development activities in Los Angeles.

The group was founded in the 1950s to fight oil drilling under area homes. Neighborhood activist Milton Rubin was elected president in 1957, soon after which he and property tax activist Howard Jarvis formed the United Organization of Taxpayers, through which the Beverly Wilshire Homes Association helped run the campaign that led to the passage of Proposition 13.

In the 1980s, the Beverly Wilshire Homes Association, under its current president, Diana Plotkin, fought efforts to extend the Los Angeles Red Line Subway through the Fairfax District. The resulting 1985 federal ban on tunneling in the area stayed in effect for more than 20 years until it was repealed in 2007.

Plotkin and the Beverly Wilshire Homes Association have since mounted legal challenges to numerous developments in the area, ranging from large projects such as The Grove at Farmers Market, a development the group eventually supported, to small restaurants and bars.

The group has won sizable legal settlements in these challenges, including one worth $1.05 million for dropping its opposition to a liquor license at Ma Maison Sofitel, an area hotel and nightclub.

In addition to serving as the group's president, Plotkin has been a member of the Los Angeles County Democratic Party's Central Committee since 1994. She also serves as co-chair of the County Democratic Party committee that recommends candidates for Democratic endorsement.
