= Mark Plotkin (chess player) =

Canadian chess player (born 1998)

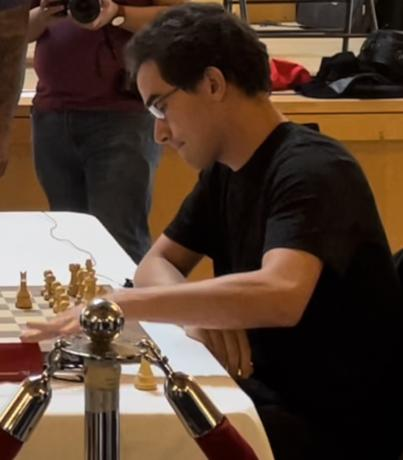
- Mark Plotkin in 2022

Personal information
- Born: December 2, 1998 (age 27) Haifa, Israel

Chess career
- Country: Canada
- Title: International Master (2020)
- Peak rating: 2435 (March 2020)

Mark Plotkin (Hebrew: מרק פלאטקין; born December 2, 1998) is a Canadian chess player and coach. He holds the FIDE title of International Master.

== Biography ==
Mark Plotkin was born in Israel to Victor Plotkin, International Master and the captain of the Canadian Olympiad team. He attended the University of Toronto where he helped the team win the Canadian University Chess Championship. During the pandemic chess boom, Mark became a full time chess teacher, while still continuing to participate in Grandmaster norm tournaments. In 2021, Plotkin won the Canadian Banff Chess Tournament. In 2022, Plotkin finished fifth in the Titled Tuesday Tournament in a field of 340 titled players. Currently, Plotkin is ranked number 16 among active players in Canada. and currently has a CFC rating of 2500.
