= Azul Systems =

Computer manufacturer of appliances for executing Java-based applications

- Type: Private
- Industry: Computer Software
- Founded: 2002
- Headquarters: Sunnyvale, California, United States
- Key people: Scott Sellers, CEO, President, and Co-Founder; Gil Tene, CTO, Co-Founder; Leonid Leniashin, VP of Engineering
- Website: www.azul.com

Azul Systems, Inc. (also known as Azul) is a company that develops and distributes runtimes (JDK, JRE, JVM) for executing Java-based applications. The company was founded in March 2002. Azul Systems has headquarters in Sunnyvale, California.

== History ==
Azul Systems was founded by Scott Sellers (now President & CEO), Gil Tene (CTO), and Shyam Pillalamarri. Initially founded as a hardware appliance company, Azul's Java Compute Appliances (JCAs) were designed to massively scale up the usable computing resources available to Java applications. The first compute appliances, offered in April 2005, were the Vega 1-based models.

With the introduction of Azul Platform Prime in 2010, the company transitioned to producing software-only products. It retired its hardware appliance Vega product lines in 2013. Stephen DeWitt previously held the position of CEO.

On April 1, 2020, Azul announced that it had closed a strategic growth equity investment led by London-based Vitruvian Partners and New York-based Lead Edge Capital. In the agreement, Azul shareholders were expected to receive a total of approximately $340 million in consideration. Based on public filings, Azul had raised more than $200M in financing to date.

In November 2025, Azul announced a definitive agreement for a majority strategic investment from Thoma Bravo, a leading software investment firm. Existing backers Vitruvian Partners and Lead Edge Capital participated with additional capital and will maintain significant minority positions. The investment is intended to further scale Azul’s operations and broaden its footprint in global enterprise and cloud markets. Guggenheim Securities acted as exclusive financial advisor to the company. Later in 2025, Azul acquired Payara.

== Products ==
=== Azul Platform Prime (formerly Zing) ===
Azul produced Platform Prime, a Java virtual machine (JVM) and runtime platform for Java applications.

Platform Prime is compliant with the associated Java SE version standards. It is based on the same HotSpot JVM and JDK code base used by the Oracle and OpenJDK JDKs, with enhancements relating to garbage collection, JIT compilation, and Warmup behaviors, all aimed at producing improved application execution metrics and performance indicators.

Key feature areas in Platform Prime include:

- C4 (Continuously Concurrent Compacting Collector): A garbage collector reported to maintain concurrent, disruption-free application execution across wide ranges of heap sizes and allocation rates [from sub-GB to multi-TB, from MBs/sec to tens of GB/sec]
- Falcon: An LLVM-based JIT compiler that delivers dynamically and heavily optimized application code at runtime
- ReadyNow: A feature aimed at improving application startup and warmup behaviors, reducing the amount of slowness experienced by Java applications as they get started or restarted

Formerly known as Zing, it first became available on October 19, 2010. The company was formerly known for its Vega Java Compute Appliances, specialized hardware designed to use compute resources available to Java applications. Zing utilized and improved on the software technology initially developed for the Vega hardware.

Platform Prime is available for Linux, and requires x86-based hardware powered by Intel or AMD processors.

=== Azul Platform Core (formerly Zulu and Zulu Embedded JVM) ===
Azul distributes and supports Zulu and Zulu Enterprise, a certified binary build of OpenJDK. The initial release in September 2013 supported Java 7 ran on Windows 2008 R2 and 2012 on the Windows Azure Cloud. On January 21, 2014, Azul announced Zulu support for multiple Linux versions, Java 6, as well as Zulu Enterprise, which has subscription support options. Support for Java 8 was added in April 2014 and Mac OS X support was added in June 2014. In September 2014, Zulu was extended to support Docker. Zulu Embedded, which allows developers to customize the build footprint, was released in March, 2015.

Azul produces the jHiccup open-source performance measurement tool for Java applications. It is designed to measure the stalls or "hiccups" caused by an application's underlying Java platform.

=== Azul Intelligence Cloud ===
In December 2021, Azul launched Intelligence Cloud, a family of products that apply cloud resources to analyze and optimize Java fleets and provide actionable intelligence. The first product, Cloud Native Compiler, uses a cloud-centric approach that decouples just-in-time (JIT) compilation from the Java virtual machine (JVM); it is compatible with all Java applications and retains the full advantages of JIT compilation.
