= Rubinius =

Alternative Ruby implementation

- Developers: Evan Phoenix, Brian Shirai
- Stable release: 5.0 / May 16, 2020; 6 years ago
- Written in: C++ and Ruby
- Operating system: Unix-like
- Type: Ruby programming language compiler
- License: Mozilla Public License
- Website: rubinius.com on Internet Archive
- Repository: github.com/rubinius/rubinius

Rubinius is an alternative Ruby implementation created by Evan Phoenix. Based loosely on the Smalltalk-80 Blue Book design, Rubinius seeks to "provide a rich, high-performance environment for running Ruby code."

== Goals ==
Rubinius follows in the Lisp and Smalltalk traditions, by natively implementing as much of Ruby as possible in Ruby code.

It also has a goal of being thread-safe in order to be able to embed more than one interpreter in a single application.

== Sponsorship ==
From 2007 to 2013, Engine Yard funded one full-time engineer to work exclusively on Rubinius.

== PowerPC64 support ==
Since version 2.4.0, support on PowerPC64 is enabled.

== See also ==
- Jikes RVM
- JRuby
- MacRuby
- MagLev
- Parrot virtual machine
- PyPy
- Squawk
- Squeak
- YARV
