= Appeal Virtual Machines =

Swedish technology company

Appeal Virtual Machines was a Swedish company created in 1998 by students from the Royal Institute of Technology in Stockholm. They were mainly known for their JRockit Java Virtual Machine.

They were acquired in 2002 by BEA Systems, who became part of Oracle Corporation in 2008.

As of 2010, some of the company founders still worked for Oracle.
