= Olivier Danvy =

French computer scientist

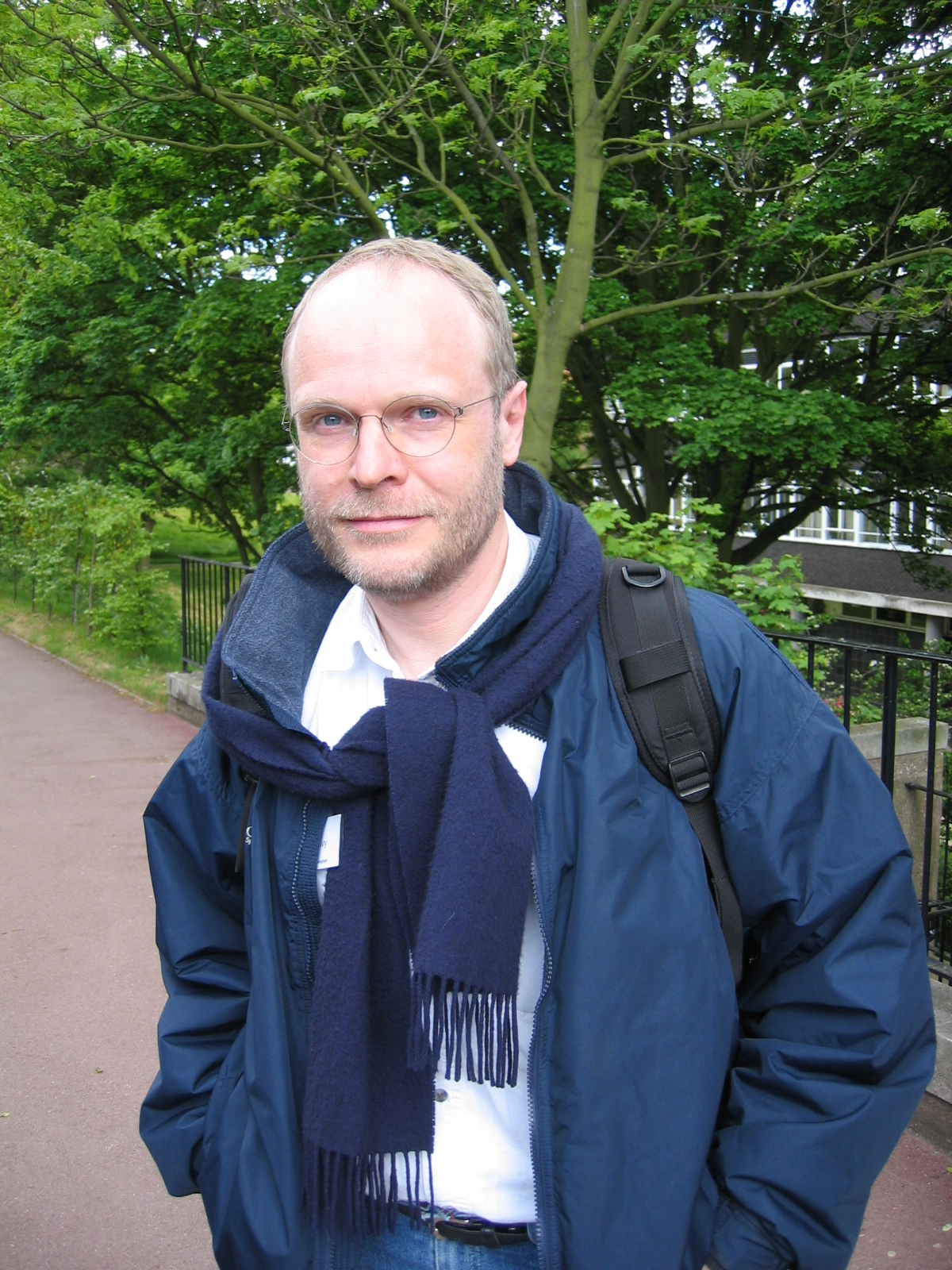
- Danvy in 2005
- Education: Université Paris VI – Pierre et Marie Curie
- Known for: Partial evaluation, continuations
- Scientific career
- Fields: Computer science
- Workplaces: BRICS, Aarhus University, Yale-NUS College, National University of Singapore
- Doctoral advisor: Bernard Robinet & Emmanuel Saint-James

Olivier Danvy is a French computer scientist specializing in programming languages, partial evaluation, and continuations. He is a professor at the School of Computing at the National University of Singapore.

Danvy received his PhD degree from the Université Paris VI in 1986. He is notable for the number of scientific papers which acknowledge his help. Writing in Nature, editor Declan Butler reports on an analysis of acknowledgments on nearly one third of a million scientific papers and reports that Danvy is "the most thanked person in computer science".

Danvy himself is quoted as being "stunned to find my name at the top of the list", ascribing his position to a "series of coincidences": he is multidisciplinary, is well travelled, is part of an international PhD programme, is a networker, and belongs to a university department with a long tradition of having many international visitors.
