= Apache Geronimo =

Open-source web application server

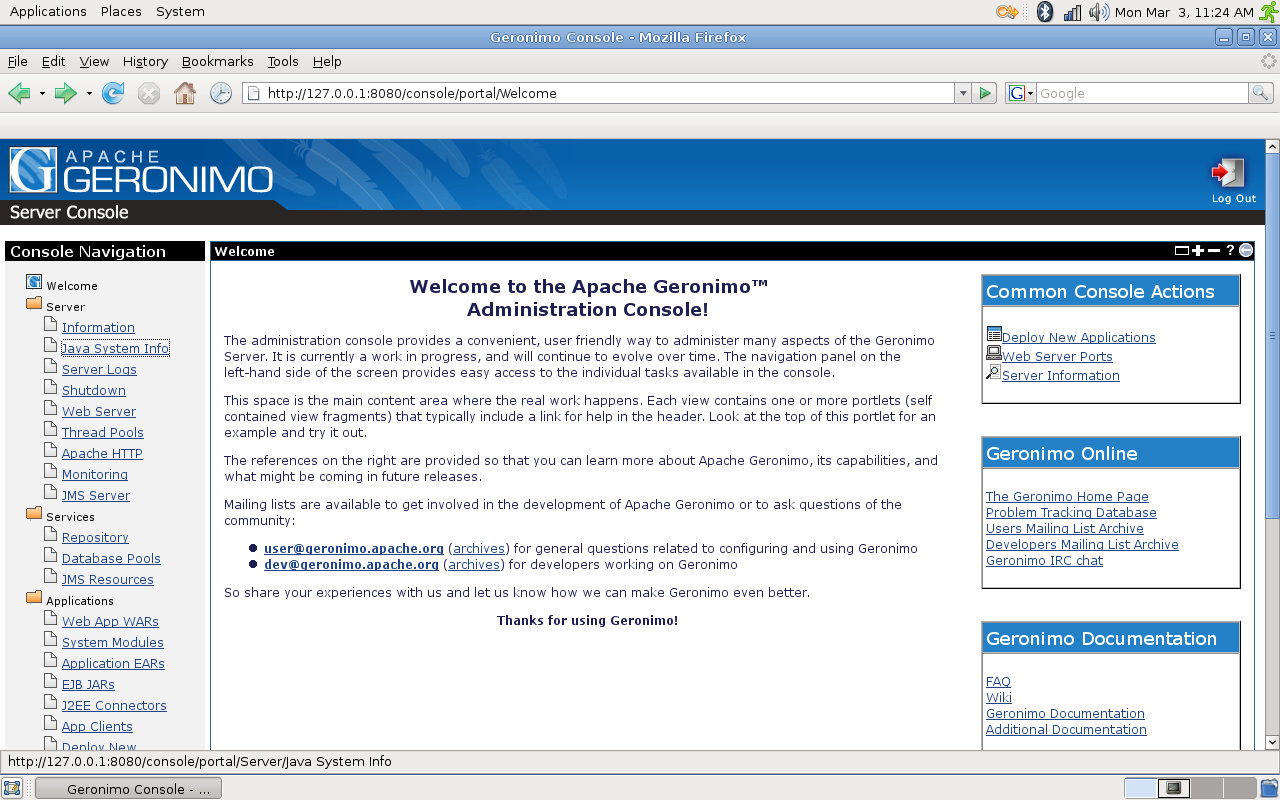
- Screenshot Apache Geronimo Web Administration Console
- Developer(s): Apache Software Foundation
- Stable release: 3.0.1 (May 28, 2013; 11 years ago) [±]
- Repository: svn.apache.org/repos/asf/geronimo/
- Written in: Java
- Operating system: Cross-platform (JVM)
- Type: Web Application Server
- License: Apache License 2.0
- Website: geronimo.apache.org

Apache Geronimo is an open source application server developed by the Apache Software Foundation and distributed under the Apache license.

Geronimo 3, the current version, is compatible with the Java Enterprise Edition (Java EE) 6 specification and therefore supports technologies such as JMS, Enterprise JavaBeans, Connectors, servlets, JSP, JSF, Unified Expression Language and JavaMail. This allows developers to create enterprise applications that are portable and scalable, and that integrate with legacy technologies. The older Geronimo 2 is compatible with Java EE 5.

IBM has in the past provided considerable support to the project through marketing, code contributions, and the funding of several project committers. In October 2005, IBM announced a free edition of its WebSphere application server named Websphere Application Server Community Edition (WASCE), which is actually a distribution of Geronimo and despite its name not related to the commercial WebSphere server. However, IBM has withdrawn marketing and support for WASCE in 2013. Other commercial supporters included AMD, Chariot Solutions, Simula Labs, and Virtuas.

Activity on Apache Geronimo has now largely ceased. Previous prolific Geronimo committers like David Jencks and others who are at IBM are now working on the Liberty Profile application server.

== Components ==
Like an enterprise operating system, Geronimo is built on a kernel—a microkernel that lays the foundation for everything above it. Geronimo's kernel is Java EE agnostic. Its sole purpose is to manage Geronimo's building blocks. Geronimo is marked by an architectural design that is based on the concept of Inversion of Control (IoC) (sometimes called Dependency Injection), which means that the kernel has no direct dependency on any of its components. The kernel is a framework for services that controls the service life cycle and registry. The kernel is based on Java EE. It works with Java EE services and components to build specific configurations—one of which is a full Java EE solution stack.

A majority of the Geronimo services are added and configured through GBeans to become a part of the overall application server. A GBean is the interface that connects the component to the kernel. Each GBean can maintain state, depend on, and interrelate with other GBeans, and operate on events from the kernel and other GBeans. The GBeans interface makes it possible to switch between two servlet containers, for example Jetty or Tomcat, without affecting the whole architecture using a GBeans interface. This flexible architecture makes it possible for the Geronimo developers to integrate several existing field-tested open source software projects.

Here a list of the open source components that are included in the Geronimo project.

Component	Description
Apache Tomcat	HTTP server and Servlet container supporting Java Servlet 2.5 and JavaServer Pages (JSP) 2.1.
Jetty	HTTP server and Servlet container supporting Java Servlet 2.5 and JavaServer Pages 2.1—an alternative to the Tomcat server.
Apache ActiveMQ	Open source Java Message Service (JMS) 1.1 applications provider and supporter of message-driven beans (MDBs).
Apache OpenEJB	Open source Enterprise JavaBeans (EJB) Container System and EJB Server that supports Enterprise JavaBeans at the 3.0 level, including Container Managed Persistence 2 (CMP2) and EJB Query Language (EJB QL).
Apache OpenJPA	Open source Java Persistence API (JPA) 1.0 implementation.
Apache ServiceMix	Open source Enterprise Service Bus (ESB) and component suite based on the Java Business Integration (JBI) standard on JSR 208.
Apache Axis and Apache Scout	Axis is a Simple Object Access Protocol (SOAP) implementation, while Scout is a JSR 93 (JAXR) implementation. These provide support for Web Services and Web Services Interoperability Organization (WS-I) Basic Profile support.
Apache CXF	Web Services frameworks with variety of protocols such as SOAP, XML/HTTP, RESTful HTTP, or CORBA and work over a variety of transports such as HTTP, JMS or JBI.
Apache Derby	Full-fledged relational database management system (RDBMS) with native Java Database Connectivity (JDBC) support.
Apache WADI	Clustering, load balancing and failover solution for the web application container tier. (The project is currently in incubation under the Apache Incubator.)
MX4J	Java Management Extensions that supplies tools for managing and monitoring applications, system objects, devices and service-oriented networks.

== See also ==
Other Java EE application servers:

- Apache TomEE
- WildFly (formerly JBoss AS)
- WebSphere AS
- WebLogic Server
- List of application servers
- GlassFish

== Bibliography ==
- Mulder, Aaron (2007), Apache Geronimo Development and Deployment, Addison-Wesley Professional, ISBN 978-0-321-33483-1
- Kumar, Kishore (2006), Pro Apache Geronimo, Apress, ISBN 1-59059-642-0, archived from the original on 2011-01-12
- Genender, Jeff; Snyder, Bruce; Li, Sing (2006), Professional Apache Geronimo, Wrox, ISBN 0-471-78543-1, archived from the original on 2005-10-28
- Blevins, David (2004), Geronimo: A Developer's Notebook, O'Reilly Media, ISBN 0-596-00671-3
