= Lutris Technologies =

Lutris Technologies, Inc.
- Founded: 1995
- Defunct: 2005
- Headquarters: Santa Cruz, California
- Products: XMLC Enhydra Server
- Website: www.lutris.com

Lutris Technologies, Inc. was an enterprise software and services company based in Santa Cruz, California. It developed an application server called Enhydra Server through about 2005.

== History ==
Lutris was founded by Paul Morgan and Michael Browder, two ex-employees of the Santa Cruz Operation about 1995, initially under the name of Information Refinery, Incorporated (IRI). The main business of the company was building web sites using the Java Platform, initially through consulting contracts. To facilitate the design and implementation of these web sites, the company built an Extensible Markup Language (XML) manipulation tool: XMLC, and Enhydra Server, a general purpose application server.

Initial venture capital funding of $10 million came in November 1999 from investors Chase Capital Partners and Chase H&Q (formerly Hambrecht & Quist). A second round for a total of $15 million, announced in February 2000, included TransCosmos USA, and the Intel 64 Fund. On August 23, 2000, an additional $16 million in funding was announced from Compaq and NEC. Presidents included David H. Young and Yancy Lind.

The names were puns on Enhydra lutris, the scientific name for the sea otter which inhabits nearby Monterey Bay. The logo for Enhydra featured a sea otter with a cup of coffee (a further pun on the slang term "Java").

== Enhydra Server ==
Enhydra Server
- Developers: Lutris, Enhydra.org
- Initial release: 1999
- Stable release: 5.1.9 / March 23, 2005; 21 years ago
- Written in: Java
- Website: www.lutris.com

Enhydra Server was a Java Platform, Standard Edition (Java SE) application server that was used for most Lutris-developed sites (including the Customatix project). In January 1999 Lutris created an open-source software community of related projects including Enhydra Server. In October 1999, Lutris announced their intention to develop Enhydra Server v4 as a Java Platform, Enterprise Edition (Java EE) application server (later to be known as Enhydra Enterprise) available as open source software. There was considerable press interest in whether this was compatible with Sun Microsystems' licensing model for Java EE, which was distributed under the Sun Community Source License (SCSL). In March 2000, Lutris announced a commercial, boxed Enhydra Server product including support. In late 1999, Lutris had purchased InstantDB, a Java database management system distributed on a free-for-non-commercial-use basis developed Peter Hearty and a company called ICS. Lutris announced their intent to distribute InstantDB as open-source. Enhydra Enterprise made its first beta release in April 2001. It was implemented with the JOnAS technology. Intel published a reference architecture for the software.

By June 2001 the InstantDB project was removed from enhydra.org, and Lutris announced that the InstantDB code would not after all be open-sourced. The Enhydra Enterprise open source repository was shut down in September 2001, with Lutris management citing the Java EE SCSL conditions as the reason, which gave rise to frustration in the open source community. Many community participants migrated to the fledgling JBoss project.

== The end ==
After the dot-com bubble burst, nearly all Lutris staff were laid off in waves from late 2001 to early 2002. By April it was down from a high of about 190 employees in three buildings, to eight. The company continued operation under a new name of Gridion, and developed a distributed high performance computing platform based on trading compute resources for grid computing. In April 2002, ObjectWeb, now known as the OW2 Consortium, took over hosting of Enhydra Server and Enhydra Enterprise. In November 2003, the German company Together Teamlösungen GmbH acquired the copyrights to Enhydra Server and Enhydra Enterprise and released them under the GNU Lesser General Public License (LGPL). The company was finally wound up sometime in 2005.
