= JSR 53 =

JSR 53 is a Java Specification Request developed under the Java Community Process. It specifies both the Java Servlet 2.3 specification and the JavaServer Pages 1.2 specification.
