= IBM WebSphere Application Server Community Edition =

WebSphere Application Server Community Edition
- Developer: IBM
- Initial release: October 2005; 20 years ago
- Final release: 3.0.0.4 / June 21, 2013; 12 years ago
- Written in: Java
- Operating system: Cross-platform
- Type: Application server
- License: Proprietary Freeware
- Website: www.ibm.com/websphere/was-ce/

WebSphere Application Server Community Edition (WASCE) was a free-of-charge, certified Java EE 6 application server for building and managing Java applications. Until September 30, 2016, it was IBM's supported distribution of Apache Geronimo that used Tomcat for servlet container and Axis 2 for web services. Another difference from Apache Geronimo is that WASCE came with Db2 and Informix database drivers, better XML parser libraries (XML4J and XLXP) and contained the latest patches from unreleased upstream versions. Over 30 WASCE developers were committers in the Apache Geronimo project.

== Product Features ==
- Java EE 6 programming model.
- Eclipse plug-in for developers.
- Embedded Apache Derby database. External database support for IBM Db2, Informix, Oracle, Microsoft SQL Server, PostgreSQL and MySQL.
- "Customizable application server software that features a small footprint, making it easier to download and manage", saving on system resources and improving performance by allowing you to dynamically enable GBean-based components.
- Centralized user management to support systems administration and deployed applications based on Java Authorization Contract for Containers (JACC) and Lightweight Directory Access Protocol (LDAP) authentication.

== End of Support ==
IBM announced that September 20, 2013, WASCE will be withdrawn from marketing and support will be withdrawn September 30, 2016.

== See also ==
- Apache Geronimo
- JBoss application server
- IBM WebSphere Application Server
- Comparison of application servers
- GlassFish
- Open Liberty

== Product news ==
- What's new in WebSphere Application Server Community Edition V2.0
- IBM WebSphere Application Server Community Edition V2.1, built on the Apache Geronimo project, offers a fast and inexpensive way to develop and deploy Java EE 5 applications
- What’s new in WebSphere Application Server Community Edition V2.1
- Software withdrawal and support discontinuance: IBM WebSphere Application Server Community Editions V2.1 and V3.0 and Entry Support for Apache Geronimo
