= WASCE =

WASCE may refer to

- IBM WebSphere Application Server Community Edition
- West African Senior School Certificate Examination
