= SailFin =

- Developers: Sun Microsystems, Ericsson
- Final release: 1.0
- Operating system: Cross-platform
- Type: Application server
- Website: web.archive.org/web/20161204202612/https://sailfin.java.net/

SailFin was an open-source Java application server project led by Sun Microsystems. It implements the JCP SIP Servlet 1.1 (JSR 289) specification integrated with the open-source Java EE application server GlassFish.

This project was archived and effectively discontinued.
