= Cmax =

Cmax may refer to:

- Customatix, a footwear company
- C Max, a maximum security prison in South Africa
- Ford C-MAX, a model of car
- Cmax (pharmacology), the maximum concentration of a drug in the body after dosing.
- CMAX, a crisis indicator designed by Patel and Sarkar
- CMAX, a bus rapid transit service in Columbus, Ohio, operated by Central Ohio Transit Authority
