= SCSL =

SCSL is an acronym that can stand for:

- Scientific Computing Software Library, by Silicon Graphics
- Special Court for Sierra Leone
- Sun Community Source Licensing, for Sun Java
- Staffordshire County Senior League in English football
- St. Croix Soccer League, association football league in US Virgin Islands
