= Apache Shiro =

Open-source Java security framework

- Developer: Apache Software Foundation
- Stable release: 3.0.2 / 2026-11-08
- Written in: Java
- Operating system: Cross-platform
- Type: Application security, Application framework, Web framework
- License: Apache License 2.0
- Website: shiro.apache.org
- Repository: Shiro Repository

Apache Shiro (pronounced "sheeroh", a Japanese word for castle (Japanese: 城)) is an open source software security framework that performs authentication, authorization, cryptography and session management. Shiro has been designed to be an intuitive and easy-to-use framework while still providing robust security features.

Shiro is easy to start with and configure, and is independent from any one framework. Unlike Spring Security, which is built around the Spring ecosystem, Shiro has no container or framework dependency. The same security API works in standalone, command-line, desktop, web and enterprise applications, and integrations are available for Jakarta EE, Spring, Spring Boot and other platforms. Its permission system supports wildcard permissions, such as printer:print:*, which let applications express fine-grained access rules in a compact, human-readable form without writing a custom permission class for each case. Shiro also provides a session API that works outside a web container, and recent releases added form save and replay, which preserves a user's in-progress form data across an authentication redirect.

== History ==
Shiro's predecessor, JSecurity, was founded in 2004 by Les Hazlewood and Jeremy Haile because they could not find a suitable Java security framework that operated well at the application level and they were frustrated with JAAS. Between 2004 and 2008, JSecurity was hosted on SourceForge and its committer list grew to include Peter Ledbrook, Alan Ditzel, Tim Veil.

In 2008, JSecurity project was submitted to the Apache Software Foundation (ASF) and accepted into their Incubator Program to be stewarded by mentors in order to become a top level Apache Project. Under the ASF's Incubator, Jsecurity was renamed Ki (pronounced Key) and shortly later renamed Shiro by the community because of trademark concerns.

The project continued to grow while in the Apache Incubator, adding Kalle Korhonen as a project committer. And in July 2010, the Shiro community released its official version 1.0, marking a period of stability in the code base. Following the release of version 1.0, the Shiro community created a Project Management Committee and elected Les Hazlewood as its chair. On September 22, 2010, Shiro became a top level project (TLP) in the Apache Software Foundation.

Between 2010 and 2023, Brian Demers, François Papon and Benjamin Marwell maintained the project, and added the foundation for new cryptographic APIs and support for stronger password encryption, such as Argon2 and BCrypt.

In 2023, Brian Demers left Okta, which stopped financially supporting Apache Shiro, leaving project maintenance to volunteers only.

In July 2025, Lenny Primak was elected Apache Shiro PMC chair. As a CTO of Flow Logix, Inc. he donated his time to the project since 2012. Lenny was instrumental in getting Shiro 2.0.0 and Shiro 3.0.0 completed.

FlowLogix and Lenny contributed Jakata EE support, Spring 7, Spring Boot 4 support, and unique features such as form save / replay support

== Security vulnerabilities ==
In 2026, many security vulnerabilities were fixed in Apache Shiro, including a few critical ones, similar to Log4Shell. Some of these can be found in Shiro's blog posts, including This one

== Releases ==
- 3.0.2 on 2026-11-08 (current stable release)
- 3.0.1 on 2026-08-24
- 3.0.0 on 2026-06-29
- 2.2.1 on 2026-06-17
- 2.0.0 on 2024-02-28
- 1.13.0 on 2024-11-13
- 1.8.0 on 2021-08-26
- 1.5.0 on 2020-01-24
- 1.4.2 on 2019-11-18
- 1.4.1 on 2019-04-18
- 1.4.0 on 2017-05-05
- 1.2.0 on 2012-01-24
- 1.1.0 on 2010-11-01

== See also ==
- Application security
- Java Authentication and Authorization Service (JAAS)
- Enterprise JavaBean#Security EJB Container-Managed Security
- JGuard, an LGPL-licensed security framework
- Spring Security, an Apache-licensed Java security framework
