= Web container =

Component of Java web server

A web container (also known as a servlet container; and compare "webcontainer") is the component of a web server that interacts with Jakarta Servlets. A web container is responsible for managing the lifecycle of servlets, mapping a URL to a particular servlet and ensuring that the URL requester has the correct access-rights. A web container handles requests to servlets, Jakarta Server Pages (JSP) files, and other types of files that include server-side code. The Web container creates servlet instances, loads and unloads servlets, creates and manages request and response objects, and performs other servlet-management tasks. A web container implements the web component contract of the Jakarta EE architecture. This architecture specifies a runtime environment for additional web components, including security, concurrency, lifecycle management, transaction, deployment, and other services.

== List of Servlet containers ==
The following is a list of notable applications which implement the Jakarta Servlet specification from Eclipse Foundation, divided depending on whether they are directly sold or not.

=== Open source Web containers ===
- Apache Tomcat (formerly Jakarta Tomcat) is an open source web container available under the Apache Software License.
  - Apache Tomcat 6 and above are operable as general application container (prior versions were web containers only)
- Apache Geronimo is a full Java EE 6 implementation by Apache Software Foundation.
- Enhydra, from Lutris Technologies.
- GlassFish from Eclipse Foundation (an application server, but includes a web container).
- Jetty, from the Eclipse Foundation. Also supports SPDY and WebSocket protocols.
- Open Liberty, from IBM, is a fully compliant Jakarta EE server
- Virgo from Eclipse Foundation provides modular, OSGi based web containers implemented using embedded Tomcat and Jetty. Virgo is available under the Eclipse Public License.
- WildFly (formerly JBoss Application Server) is a full Java EE implementation by Red Hat, division JBoss.

=== Commercial Web containers ===
- iPlanet Web Server, from Oracle.
- JBoss Enterprise Application Platform from Red Hat, division JBoss is subscription-based/open-source Jakarta EE-based application server.
- WebLogic Application Server, from Oracle Corporation (formerly developed by BEA Systems).
- Orion Application Server, from IronFlare.
- Resin Pro, from Caucho Technology.
- IBM WebSphere Application Server.
- SAP NetWeaver.
