= Apache TomEE =

Computer Software

- Developer: Apache Software Foundation
- Initial release: April 27, 2012; 13 years ago
- Stable release: 9.1.1 / 12 October 2023
- Preview release: 9.0.0-M8 / 28 June 2022
- Repository: TomEE Repository
- Written in: Java
- Operating system: Cross-platform (JVM)
- Type: Application server
- License: Apache-2.0
- Website: http://tomee.apache.org

Apache TomEE (pronounced "Tommy") is the Enterprise Edition of Apache Tomcat (Tomcat + Java/Jakarta EE = TomEE) that combines several Java enterprise projects including Apache OpenEJB, Apache OpenWebBeans, Apache OpenJPA, Apache MyFaces and others. In October 2011, the project obtained certification by Oracle Corporation as a compatible implementation of the Java EE 6 Web Profile.

== Components ==
TomEE includes the following open-source components:

Component	Description
Apache Tomcat	HTTP server and Servlet container supporting Java Servlet and JavaServer Pages (JSP).
Apache OpenEJB	Open-source Enterprise JavaBeans (EJB) container system.
Apache OpenWebBeans	Open-source Java Contexts and Dependency Injection (CDI) implementation.
Apache OpenJPA	Open-source Java Persistence API (JPA) 2.1 implementation.
Apache Geronimo Transaction	Open-source Java Transaction API (JTA) 1.2 implementation.
Apache MyFaces	Open-source Java Server Faces (JSF) implementation.
Apache ActiveMQ	Open-source Java Message Service (JMS) implementation.
Apache CXF	Web Services frameworks with a variety of protocols - such as SOAP, XML/HTTP, RESTful HTTP.
Apache Derby	Full-fledged relational database management system (RDBMS) with native Java Database Connectivity (JDBC) support.

TomEE JAX-RS, a second distribution, adds support for Java API for RESTful Web Services (JAX-RS).

The full TomEE Plus distribution adds additional support for:

- Java API for XML Web Services (JAX-WS)
- Java EE Connector Architecture
- Java Messaging Service (JMS)

== History ==
The OpenEJB project was started by Richard Monson-Haefel and David Blevins in 1999 as an open source implementation of the Enterprise JavaBeans specification. Blevins continued to develop OpenEJB and integrate components of this project with Apache Geronimo. In 2003, the OpenEJB component became a project operating under the auspices of the Apache Software Foundation at which time it was rewritten with a focus on leveraging Tomcat as an embedded web container. A beta version of TomEE was released in October 2011, and the first production-ready version was shipped in April 2012.

=== Versions ===
Version	Release date
9.0.0.RC1	October 31, 2022
9.0.0-M7	May 10, 2021
9.0.0-M3	November 24, 2020
9.0.0-M2	August 7, 2020
9.0.0-M1	June 22, 2020
8.0.8	August 31, 2021
8.0.5	November 24, 2020
8.0.4	August 7, 2020
8.0.3	June 22, 2020
8.0.2	May 26, 2020
8.0.1	Jan 20, 2020
8.0.0	Sep 11, 2019
8.0.0-M3	May 23, 2019
8.0.0-M2	January 25, 2019
8.0.0-M1	October 19, 2018
7.1.1	June 21, 2019
7.1.0	September 7, 2018
7.0.6	June 6, 2019
7.0.5	July 23, 2018
7.0.4	September 26, 2017
7.0.3	March 13, 2017
7.0.2	November 6, 2016
7.0.1	June 23, 2016
7.0.0	May 25, 2016
7.0.0-M3	March 6, 2016
7.0.0-M2	March 1, 2016
7.0.0-M1	December 12, 2015
1.7.5	October 24, 2017
1.7.4	March 7, 2016
1.7.3	December 4, 2015
1.7.2	May 18, 2015
1.7.1	September 12, 2014
1.7.0	August 10, 2014
1.6.0.2	May 6, 2014
1.6.0.1	April 16, 2014
1.6.0	November 17, 2013
1.5.2	March 17, 2013
1.5.1	December 14, 2012
1.5.0	September 28, 2012
1.0.0	April 27, 2012
1.0.0 Beta 2	January 17, 2012
1.0.0 Beta 1	October 2, 2011

== Commercial support ==
Two years after the announcement of Apache TomEE at JavaOne 2011 several Apache TomEE creators united to form Tomitribe, a commercial support company dedicated to the Apache TomEE community and focused on promoting open source values.

Another commercial support company provides enterprise support for Apache TomEE is ManageCat. ManageCat involves with a lot of Apache Java EE projects to contribute open source Java EE ecosystem.

== See also ==
- List of application servers
