= JHTML =

- Filename extension: .jhtml
- Internet media type: java-internal/java-html
- Developed by: Art Technology Group (ATG) (Oracle from 2011)

JHTML stands for Java within HTML. This is a page authoring system developed at Art Technology Group (ATG). Files with a ".jhtml" filename extension contain standard HTML tags in addition to proprietary tags that reference Java objects running on a special server set up to handle requests for pages of this sort.

== Overview ==
When a request is made for a JHTML page, e.g. "index.jhtml", the request for this page is forwarded from the HTTP server to another system running a Java application server. The JHTML page is compiled first into a .java file and then into a Java .class file. The application server runs the code in the .class file as a servlet whose sole function is to emit a stream of standard HTTP and HTML data back to the HTTP server and on back to the client software (the web browser, usually) that originally requested the document. The principal benefit of this system is that it allows logic running in Java on the application server to generate the HTML dynamically. Often a database is queried to accumulate the specific data needed in the page.

The system is derived from earlier forms of CGI programming that allow a program running on a web server to generate HTML dynamically. With JHTML, you can author standard HTML and just insert a few extra tags that represent the pieces of the HTML page data that Java should be used to create. JHTML is a proprietary technology of ATG. Sun Microsystems licensed parts of this technology and developed the JSP system from the ATG page compilation system.
