= JEUS =

Korean web application server

MR.worldwide
- Developer(s): TmaxSoft
- Stable release: 8.5 (8 Fix#5/b266) / February 2020
- Operating system: Cross-platform
- Type: Application Server
- License: Proprietary
- Website: tmaxsoft.com

JEUS (an abbreviation of Java Enterprise User Solution) is a Korean Web application server which is developed by TmaxSoft. JEUS provides the web application server component of TmaxSoft's middleware-tier framework solution. It has been widely adopted in Korea where it holds the largest (42.1%) share of the market.

TmaxSoft released JEUS 1.0 in 2000. In 2001, it received J2EE 1.2 certification for JEUS 3.0., In 2013, it received the world’s first Java EE 7 certification for JEUS 8.

== History ==
JEUS was launched in April 2000. The following table shows a list of versions and release dates:

| Product/Version | 1.0 | 2.0 | 3.0 | 4.0 | 5.0 | 6.0 | 7.0 | 8.0 | 8.5 |
|---|---|---|---|---|---|---|---|---|---|
| JEUS | 2000.04 | 2001.02 | 2002.05 | 2003.03 | 2005.05 | 2007.06 | 2012.06 | 2013.08 | 2020.02 |

== Features ==
JEUS 7 provides the following features:

- Cloud Architecture Support

Domain Architecture: (JEUS 7) supports a massive scale computing environment with lightweight and speedy distributed clustering.

Dynamic Clustering: A core function that enables rapid elasticity which allows the administrator to easily add and delete idle resources as needed.

Graceful Redeployment: When application redeployment is needed during operation, a continuous service environment is provided by guaranteeing the completion of processing of session requests prior to redeployment.

- Consolidated Caching

Superior performance is provided for large-scale requests, by the improved caching function. Memory is managed efficiently by the use of an optimized LRU Processing Algorithm that improves performance.

- Stable Large Capacity Transaction Processing

When connected to the WebtoB server, stable large-scale transaction processing ability is exhibited, due to Multiplexing I/O, Request Queuing, Dynamic Load Balancing, and Stream Pipe Communication

- Hot Swap

By reloading only the modified class instead of the entire class, when a function is modified, development productivity is dramatically improved.

== WebtoB ==
WebtoB is the web server component that complements JEUS as TmaxSoft's middleware-tier solution. WebtoB uses a multi-thread architecture, which allows it to address multiple requests through a single process. Other features include disk and memory caching, load balancing, clustering, dynamic queuing and the ability to add additional nodes without interrupting operations, all of which help improve the server's speed and stability. WebtoB uses secure sockets layer and operates without open firewall ports, which inherently provides for stronger data security. Administrators can also configure access control lists.

== Java EE Certification ==
- JEUS 3.0 : J2EE 1.2 certified, 2002
- JEUS 4.0 : J2EE 1.3 certified, 2004
- JEUS 5.0 : J2EE 1.4 certified, 2005
- JEUS 6.0 : Java EE 5 certified, 2007
- JEUS 7.0 : Java EE 6 certified, 2012
- JEUS 8.0 : Java EE 7 certified
- JEUS 8.5 : JaKarta EE 8 certified

== Minimum Installation Requirements ==
The following shows the minimum installation requirements for JEUS

Windows 2000, 2003, XP, Vista

- 500MB or more of Hard Disk Space
- 128MB RAM

Solaris, HP-UX, AIX, Linux

- 500MB or more of Hard Disk space

== Edition ==
There are two editions of JEUS available:

- Standard Edition
- Enterprise Edition

== Specifications support by version ==
| Specification | Jeus 4.2 | Jeus 5 | Jeus 6 | Jeus 7 | Jeus 8 | Jeus 8.5 |
|---|---|---|---|---|---|---|
| J2EE | J2EE 1.3 | J2EE 1.4 | Java EE 5 | Java EE 6 | Java EE 7 | Jakarta EE 8 |
| HTTP | 1.0/1.1 | 1.0/1.1 | 1.0/1.1 | 1.0/1.1 | 1.0/1.1 | 1.0/1.1 |
| CGI | 1.1 | 1.1 | 1.1 | 1.1 | 1.1 | 1.1 |
| PHP | 3.x/4.x | 3.x/4.x | 3.x/4.x/5.x | 3.x/4.x/5.x | | |
| SSL | SSL2/SSL3/TLS1 | SSL2/SSL3/TLS1 | SSL2/SSL3/TLS1 | /SSL3/TLS1 | | |
| EJB | 2.0 (2.1 partially) | 2.1 | 2.1 | 3.1 | | |
| Java persistence API | - | - | 1.0 | 2.0 | | |
| RMI-IOP | Supported | Supported | Supported | Supported | | |
| Deployment API | - | 1.1 | 1.2 | 1.2 | | |
| JSP | 1.2 | 2.0 | 2.1 | 2.2 | | |
| Servlet | 2.3 | 2.4 | 2.5 | 3.0 | | |
| JSF | - | - | 1.2 | 2.0 | | |
| JSTL | - | - | 1.2 | 1.2 | | |
| JTA | 1.0.1B | 1.0.1B | 1.1 | 1.1 | | |
| JTS | 1.0 | 1.0 | 1.0 | 1.0 | | |
| JMS | 1.1 | 1.1 | 1.1 | 1.1 | | |
| JNDI | 1.2.1 | 1.2.1 | 1.2.1 | 1.2.1 | | |
| JDBC | 3.0 | 3.0 | 3.0 | 4.0 | | |
| JAAS | 1.0.1 | 1.0.1 | 1.0.1 | 1.0.1 | | |
| JCA (Connector) | 1.0 | 1.5 | 1.5 | 1.6 | | |
| SAAJ | 1.1/1.2 | 1.1/1.2 | 1.3 | 1.3 | | |
| JACC | N/A | 1.0 | 1.0 | 1.3 | | |
| SOAP | 1.1 | 1.1/1.2 | 1.1/1.2 | 1.1/1.2 | | |
| WSDL | 1.1 | 1.1 | 1.1 | 1.1 | | |
| UDDI | 2.0 | 2.0/3.0 | 2.0/3.0 | 2.0/3.0 | | |
| JAX-RPC | 1.0 | 1.1 | 1.1 | 1.1 | | |
| JAX-WS | - | - | 2.1 | 2.2 | | |
| Web Service Metadata | - | - | 2.0 | 2.1 | | |
| WS-Addressing | - | - | 1.0 | 1.0 | | |
| WS-Reliable Messaging | - | - | 1.1 | 1.1 | | |
| WS-Security | - | 1.0 | 1.0/1.1 | 1.1 | | |
| WS-Policy | - | - | 1.0 | 1.0 | | |
| WS-Security Policy | - | - | 1.2 | 1.2 | | |
| WS-Trust | - | - | 1.3 | 1.3 | | |
| WS-Secure Conversation | - | - | 1.3 | 1.3 | | |
| WS-Policy Attachment | - | - | 1.0 | 1.5 | | |
| JAF | - | 1.0.2 | 1.0.2 | 1.1 | | |
| JAXB | - | 1.0 | 2.1 | 2.2 | | |
| JAXP | 1.0 | 1.2 | 1.2 | included in Java SE 6 | | |
| JAXR | - | 1.0 | 1.0 | 1.0 | | |
| XSLT | 1.0 | 1.0 | 1.0 | 1.0 | | |
| Java IDL API | - | Supported | Supported | Supported | | |
| OTS | Not Supported | Supported | Supported | Supported | | |
| IDE Tool | Supported | Supported | Supported | Not Supported | | |
| GUI Tool | JManager | JUESBuilder | Not Supported | Not Supported | | |
| Web Tool | WebManager | WebManager | WebManager | WebAdmin | | |
| J2EE Management | - | 1.0 | 1.1 | 1.1 | | |
| Monitoring Tool | Jmanager, WebManager Console Tool | Console Tool, WebManager | Console Tool, WebManager | Console Tool, WebAdmin | | |
| JDK | 1.3/1.4 | 1.4/5.0 | 5.0/6.0 | 6.0/7.0 | | |

== Competitor Products ==
- WebLogic : produced by Oracle. United States
- WebSphere: produced by IBM. United States

== See also ==
- Web server
- Web application server
- TmaxSoft
