= Sailfin =

Sailfin may refer to:

- Sailfin molly, a species of fish, Poecilia latipinna.
- SailFin, SIP application server.
- Sailfin moonfishes.
- Hydrosaurus, commonly known as the sailfin dragons or sailfin lizards, is a genus of lizards in the family Agamidae.
