= GlassFish HK2 =

HK2
- Developer(s): Eclipse Foundation
- Stable release: 3.1.1 / July 4, 2024; 8 months ago
- Repository: github.com/eclipse-ee4j/glassfish-hk2
- Operating system: Cross-platform
- Available in: Java 6 or Higher
- Type: Dependency Injection Kernel
- License: Eclipse Public License 2.0 or GPL v2 w/Classpath exception
- Website: eclipse-ee4j.github.io/glassfish-hk2/

HK2 (Hundred-Kilobyte Kernel) is a light-weight and dynamic dependency injection framework and is a part of the GlassFish Application Server.

HK2 complies with JSR 330 (Dependency Injection for Java). It has useful utilities for marking classes as services and interfaces as contracts.

Some of the features of HK2 DI Kernel are

- Custom scopes
- use of proxies
- Custom injection resolution
- Assisted injection
- J-I-T injection resolution
- Custom validation and security
- Run Level Services
