= Apache OpenWebBeans =

- Developer: Apache Software Foundation
Stable release
- 1.2.x: 1.2.8 / 22 April 2015; 10 years ago
- 1.7.x: 1.7.6 / 17 December 2018; 7 years ago
- 2.0.x: 2.0.27 / 24 May 2022; 3 years ago
- Repository: OpenWebBeans Repository
- Written in: Java
- Operating system: Cross-platform
- Type: CDI Container
- License: Apache License 2.0
- Website: http://openwebbeans.apache.org

OpenWebBeans is an open source, embeddable and lightweight CDI Container, released under the Apache License 2.0. OpenWebBeans is an ASL-licensed implementation of Context and Dependency Injection for Java EE Platform Specification which is defined by JSR-299, JSR-346, and JSR-365. OpenWebBeans has been integrated with Java EE application servers such as Geronimo and Apache TomEE.

== History ==
OpenWebBeans was founded by Gurkan Erdogdu in October 2008. It is one of implementation of the Context and Dependency Injection specification. The incubator proposal can be found here. It was graduated in December 2009 to become a top level ASF project.

== Versions ==
OpenWebBeans releases
OWB version	CDI spec	JDK version	Released
2.0.10	2.0	8+	2019-01-13
1.7.6	1.2	7+	2018-12-26
1.2.8	1.1	5+	2018-05-04

== See also ==
- Context and Dependency Injection (CDI)
