= MVEL =

- Developers: Mike Brock and Various Contributors
- Stable release: 2.5.4.Final / September 2, 2026
- Written in: Java
- Operating system: Cross-platform
- Type: Expression Language (EL)
- License: Apache License
- Website: mvel.documentnode.com
- Repository: github.com/mvel/mvel

MVFLEX Expression Language (MVEL) is a hybrid dynamic/statically typed, embeddable Expression Language and runtime for the Java Platform. Originally started as a utility language for an application framework, the project is now developed completely independently.

MVEL is typically used for exposing basic logic to end-users and programmers through configuration such as XML files or annotations. It may also be used to parse simple JavaBean expressions.

The runtime allows MVEL expressions to be executed either interpretively, or through a pre-compilation process with support for runtime bytecode generation to remove overhead.

Since MVEL is meant to augment Java-based software, it borrows most of its syntax directly from the Java programming language with some minor differences and additional capabilities. For example: as a side effect of MVEL's typing model, which treats class and method references as regular variables, it is possible to use both class and function pointers (but only for static methods).

millis = System.currentTimeMillis;

// Get milliseconds
time = millis();

MVEL also allows collections to be represented as folds (or projections) in a Lisp-like syntax.

namesOfParents = (parent.name in (children in employees));

== Hello world example ==
System.out.println("Hello, world!");

MVEL relies on Java namespaces and classes, but does not possess the ability to declare namespaces or classes.

== Quicksort example ==
Here is an example of the Quicksort algorithm implemented in MVEL 2.0, demonstrating the scripting capabilities of the language.

import java.util.*;

// The main quicksort algorithm
def quicksort(list) {
    if (list.size() <= 1) {
         list;
    }
    else {
         pivot = list[0];
         concat(quicksort(($ in list if $ < pivot)), pivot, quicksort(($ in list if $ > pivot)));
    }
}

// Define method to concatenate lists.
def concat(list1, pivot, list2) {
    concatList = new ArrayList(list1);
    concatList.add(pivot);
    concatList.addAll(list2);
    concatList;
}

// Create a list to sort
list = [5,2,4,1,18,10,15,1,0];

// Sort it!
quicksort(list);

== See also ==
- Java
- OGNL
- Expression Language
