= RoadRunner (application server) =

Open-source application server, load-balancer, and process manager

- Original author: Anton Titov
- Initial release: January 2018; 8 years ago
- Stable release: 2.10.4 / June 10, 2022; 3 years ago
- Repository: github.com/roadrunner-server/roadrunner
- Written in: Go
- Type: Application server
- License: MIT License
- Website: roadrunner.dev

RoadRunner is an open-source application server, load-balancer and process manager written in Go and implemented by PHP 7. It is used in rapid application development to speed up the performance of large web applications for users. It is often used in conjunction with frameworks like Symfony, Laravel, and others to enhance the performance and responsiveness of PHP web applications.

== History ==
Development on RoadRunner began in 2017 by Anton Titov and was released in 2018 on GitHub, under an MIT license. "Introducing RoadRunner: A High-Performance PHP Application Server". 19 November 2018. "By the middle of 2018, we polished the approach, published it to GitHub under an MIT license, and called it RoadRunner which described its incredible speed and efficiency."

RoadRunner was created to handle the peak loads of a large-scale PHP application developed by Spiral Scout. The end application was experiencing anomaly peaks in very short spurts of time, which did not allow classic load balancing mechanisms to activate.

Roadrunner uses multi-threading to keep a PHP application in memory between requests, allowing it to eliminate boot loading and code loading processes and reduce latency. Improved RPC communication between the PHP application and its server processes gives Roadrunner the ability to offload some of the heavy communication from PHP to Go.

== Application features ==
- Production-ready PSR-7 compatible HTTP, HTTP2, FastCGI server
- No external PHP dependencies (64-bit version required)
- Frontend agnostic (Queue, PSR-7, GRPC, etc.)
- Background job processing (AMQP, Amazon SQS, Beanstalk and memory)
- gRPC server and clients
- Pub/Sub and WebSockets broadcasting
- Integrated metrics server (Prometheus)
- Integrations with Symfony, Laravel, Slim, CakePHP, Zend Expressive, Spiral

== Licensing ==
RoadRunner is a free open-source software released under an MIT license. It can be downloaded and installed as a package from the project page or from GitHub.

== Versions ==
Version	Release date
v0.9.0	28 January 2018
v1.0.0	13 June 2018
v1.1.1	6 July 2018
v1.2.8	26 December 2018
v1.3.7	21 March 2019
v1.4.8	6 September 2019
v1.5.1	10 October 2019
v1.6.0	11 February 2020
v1.7.0	23 March 2020
v1.8.0	5 May 2020
