= Jakarta Standard Tag Library =

Component of the Jakarta EE Web application development platform

JSTL
- Stable release: 3.0.0 / May 14, 2022; 2 years ago
- OS: Multiplatform
- Filename extensions: .jsp .jspf .jsf
- Website: projects.eclipse.org/projects/ee4j.jstl

The Jakarta Standard Tag Library (JSTL; formerly JavaServer Pages Standard Tag Library) is a component of the Java EE Web application development platform. It extends the JSP specification by adding a tag library of JSP tags for common tasks, such as XML data processing, conditional execution, database access, loops and internationalization.

== Specification ==
JSTL was developed under the Java Community Process (JCP) as Java Specification Request (JSR) 52. On May 8, 2006, JSTL 1.2 was released, followed by JSTL 1.2.1 on Dec 7, 2011.

In addition to JSTL, the JCP has the following JSRs to develop standard JSP tag libraries:

- JSR 128: JESI – JSP Tag Library for Edge Side Includes (inactive)
- JSR 267: JSP Tag Library for Web Services

== General Responsibilities ==
JSTL provides an effective way to embed logic within a JSP page without using embedded Java code directly. The use of a standardized tag set, rather than breaking in and out of Java code, leads to more maintainable code and enables separation of concerns between the development of the application code and user interface.

=== Tag Library Descriptor ===
There are a total of six JSTL Tag Library Descriptors:

- Core library. E.g. ⟨c:if⟩ and ⟨c:when⟩
- i18n-capable formatting library
- Database tag library, contains tags for querying, creating and updating database table.
- XML library
- functions library
- TLVs allow translation-time validation of the XML view of a JSP page. The TLVs provided by JSTL allow tag library authors to enforce restrictions regarding the use of scripting elements and permitted tag libraries in JSP pages.

A Tag Library Descriptor is also known as TLD. A TLD is an XML document, so it is case-sensitive.

==== Core Library ====
The JSTL core library is the most commonly used library and holds the core tags for common tasks. Examples of common tasks include if/else statements and loops. It is mandatory to use a taglib directive to specify the URI of the JSTL core library using a prefix. Although there are many options for the prefix, the c prefix is most commonly chosen prefix for this library.

== See also ==
- Unified Expression Language
