= Java Research License =

- Publisher: Sun Microsystems
- Debian FSG compatible: no
- FSF approved: no
- OSI approved: no
- GPL compatible: no
- Website: www.java.net/jrl.csp

The Java Research License (JRL) is a software distribution license created by Sun in an effort to simplify and relax the terms from the "research section" of the Sun Community Source License. Sun's J2SE 1.6.0, Mustang, is licensed under the JRL as well as many projects at Java.net.

The JRL was introduced in 2003 to try to "make things a lot more friendly to people doing academic research" into the Java language, before the core of Java was made open source in 2006.

Although the JRL has elements of an open source license, the terms forbid any commercial use and are thus incompatible with both the Free Software Definition and the Open Source Definition. The JRL is a research license to be used for non-commercial academic uses.

== See also ==
- Sun Microsystems
- OpenJDK
