= Jakarta RESTful Web Services =

Jakarta EE specification

Jakarta RESTful Web Services (JAX-RS)
- Original author(s): Sun Microsystems
- Developer(s): Eclipse Foundation
- Stable release: 3.1.9 / October 17, 2024; 5 months ago
- Repository: github.com/jakartaee/rest
- Written in: Java
- Operating system: Cross-platform
- Platform: Java
- Type: Application framework
- License: EPL 2.0 or GPL v2 w/Classpath exception
- Website: projects.eclipse.org/projects/ee4j.jaxrs

Jakarta RESTful Web Services, (JAX-RS; formerly Java API for RESTful Web Services) is a Jakarta EE API specification that provides support in creating web services according to the Representational State Transfer (REST) architectural pattern. JAX-RS uses annotations, introduced in Java SE 5, to simplify the development and deployment of web service clients and endpoints.

From version 1.1 on, JAX-RS is an official part of Java EE 6. A notable feature of being an official part of Java EE is that no configuration is necessary to start using JAX-RS. For non-Java EE 6 environments a small entry in the web.xml deployment descriptor is required.

== Specification ==
JAX-RS provides some annotations to aid in mapping a resource class (a POJO) as a web resource. The annotations use the Java package jakarta.ws.rs (previously was javax.ws.rs but was renamed on May 19, 2019). They include:

- @Path specifies the relative path for a resource class or method.
- @GET, @POST, @PUT, @PATCH (since JAX-RS 2.1), @DELETE, @HEAD and @OPTIONS (since JAX-RS 1.1) specify the HTTP request type of a resource.
- @Produces specifies the response Internet media types (used for content negotiation).
- @Consumes specifies the accepted request Internet media types.

In addition, it provides further annotations to method parameters to pull information out of the request. All the @*Param annotations take a key of some form which is used to look up the value required.

- @PathParam binds the method parameter to a path segment.
- @QueryParam binds the method parameter to the value of an HTTP query parameter.
- @MatrixParam binds the method parameter to the value of an HTTP matrix parameter.
- @HeaderParam binds the method parameter to an HTTP header value.
- @CookieParam binds the method parameter to a cookie value.
- @FormParam binds the method parameter to a form value.
- @DefaultValue specifies a default value for the above bindings when the key is not found.
- @Context returns the entire context of the object (for example @Context HttpServletRequest request).

== JAX-RS 2.0 ==
In January 2011 the JCP formed the JSR 339 expert group to work on JAX-RS 2.0. The main targets are (among others) a common client API and support for Hypermedia following the HATEOAS-principle of REST. In May 2013, it reached the Final Release stage.

On 2017-08-22 JAX-RS 2.1 specification final release was published. Main new supported features include server-sent events, reactive clients, and JSON-B.

== Implementations ==
Implementations of JAX-RS include:

- Apache CXF, an open source Web service framework
- Jersey, the reference implementation from Sun (now Oracle)
- RESTeasy, JBoss's implementation
- Restlet
- WebSphere Application Server from IBM:
  - Version 7.0: via the "Feature Pack for Communications Enabled Applications"
  - Version 8.0 onwards: natively
- WebLogic Application Server from Oracle, see notes
- Apache Tuscany (http://tuscany.apache.org/documentation-2x/sca-java-bindingrest.html), discontinued
- Cuubez framework (https://web.archive.org/web/20190707005602/http://cuubez.com/)
- Everrest, Codenvy's Implementation
- Jello-Framework, Java Application Framework optimized for Google App Engine, including a powerful RESTful engine and comprehensive Data Authorization model.
- Apache TomEE, an addition to Apache Tomcat
