= Customatix =

- Two examples of Customatix shoes.
- Industry: Shoes
- Founded: 2000
- Fate: Defunct
- Headquarters: Santa Cruz, California

Customatix (later "Cmax") was a Santa Cruz, California-based seller of made-to-order footwear launched in May 2000. The parent company, Solemates, Inc., was founded in 1999 by former Adidas executives Dave Ward, Irmi Kreuzer, Mikal Peveto and David Solk.

Through the Customatix.com website, customers could personalize various shoe designs and purchase their custom pairs. Each base design offered a wide range of customizable options, including materials, colors, text, and graphics, resulting in trillions of possible combinations.

The web application was created by a dot com engineering company called Lutris Technologies. The Chief Designer was Noel Barnes and Production Manager was Daryl L Tempesta. The Cmax project was published in the magazine "HOW". Over 1 million images were created. Some shoes had 3 billion trillion combinations.

Customized shoes were manufactured in China and shipped directly to the customer.

By mid-2004, the website had gone offline.

== See also ==
- Mass customization
- Configuration system
