= TmaxSoft =

TmaxSoft, Inc.
- Type: Private
- Industry: Software & Programming
- Founded: Seoul, South Korea (1997)
- Headquarters: Bundang-gu, Seongnam-si, Gyeonggi-do, Republic of Korea Headquarters
- Key people: TmaxSoft CEO and President; Hyongyong Lee
- Number of employees: Over 530 (as of 2025)
- Website: www.tmaxsoft.com

TmaxSoft is a South Korea-based multinational corporation specializing in enterprise software. Founded in 1997 by Professor Daeyeon Park, a former professor at Korea Advanced Institute of Science and Technology (KAIST).

As a member of the Java Community Process (JCP), TmaxSoft offers various middleware products, including Tmax (Transaction Process Monitoring), JEUS (Web Application Server), and the WebtoB (Web Server). Other products include ProFrame (Application Framework for banking), OpenFrame (Mainframe legacy rehosting), AnyLink (Integrated Interface Solution), AnyAPI (API Management Solution), AnyEIMS (Enterprise Interface Management System).

TmaxSoft has also gained international recognition with its mainframe modernization solution OpenFrame, which supports enterprise cloud migration. The company reports more than 4,000 customer references worldwide.

== History ==
TmaxSoft developed Tmax, South Korea’s first standard TP monitor product, in 1997. In 2000, it released JEUS and WebtoB, and in 2001 obtained certification for J2EE 1.2, followed by J2EE 1.3 certification in 2002. The company established its Japan subsidiary in 2001 and its United States subsidiary in 2002.

In 2003, TmaxSoft launched AnyLink and Tibero, and achieved the world’s first J2EE 1.4 certification. The following year, it introduced OpenFrame, JEUS 5.0, BizMaster, and SysMaster, and opened an R&D center in Bundang, Seongnam.

In 2005, it released ProFrame and was included in the Gartner Enterprise Application Server (EAS) Magic Quadrant (2Q 2005).

In 2006, the company obtained the world’s first Java EE 5 certification. It ranked first in the South Korean WAS market in 2003, 2004, and 2008, according to IDC Korea. In 2013, JEUS 8 became the first product in the world to achieve Java EE 7 certification.

In 2009 and 2011 JEUS(TM) positioned in 'Visionary' Gartner Magic Quadrant

In March 2022, TmaxSoft was acquired by the private equity firm Skylake Investment, separating it from the Tmax Group. In August 2024, Tmax Group reacquired TmaxSoft with funding from STIC Investment and Cactus Private Equity. However, in December 2024, following the transfer of all shares of TmaxData to a consortium led by STIC Investment and Cactus Private Equity, TmaxSoft and TmaxTibero transitioned to an independent management structure.

Since 2011, TmaxSoft has maintained the leading position in South Korea’s application server market for 14 consecutive years with JEUS and WebtoB. The company recently obtained the first domestic certification for Jakarta EE 11 with JEUS 11. Globally, it has expanded its digital transformation (DX) business, particularly through OpenFrame, and has been recognized as a leader in the mainframe modernization software category in the annual quadrant reports published by Information Services Group for five consecutive years since 2021. The company has also announced its strategic shift toward becoming a global AI business platform provider.

== Company expansion ==
The company has established subsidiaries in Japan (2000), the USA (2002), China (2003), Singapore (2013), the UK (2013), Russia (2013), and Brazil (2014). In the domestic market, Tmax holds a 42.1% share of the middleware market, with its products used by major financial and government institutions.

== Products ==
TmaxSoft’s product portfolio includes application servers, business frameworks, interface platforms, mainframe modernization solutions, and IT operations management software.

- Application Server: JEUS, WebtoB
- Business Framework: ProFrame, ProObject, Tmax
- Interface Platform: AnyLink, AnyAPI, AnyEIMS, AnySim
- Mainframe Modernization Solution: OpenFrame
- IT Operations Management Software: HyperFrame
