= Wrox Press =

Technical publishing imprint

Wrox Press (established in 1992) is a computer book publisher, originally based in Birmingham, England. Wrox uses a "programmer to programmer" approach, as all books published by Wrox are written by software developers. The original books were easily recognized by their red covers and black and white pictures of the authors.

The holding company of the original Wrox Press, Peer Information, liquidated its assets in an insolvency process executed during 2003. The name and some of the more successful titles (but not the company itself) were acquired by John Wiley & Sons, which continues to publish under the Wrox imprint.
