= Sun Community Source License =

Community source software licensing model

- Author: Sun Microsystems
- Published: 1998
- Debian FSG compatible: No
- FSF approved: No
- OSI approved: No
- GPL compatible: No
- Copyleft: ?

The Sun Community Source License (SCSL) is a community source software licensing model designed by Sun Microsystems that covers the J2SE and J2EE software development kits. Sun introduced the SCSL in 1998 to maintain compatibility within the Java platform and make code available for commercial use. In 2004, Sun began to favor the simpler Java Research License for noncommercial use.

The SCSL includes elements similar to an open-source license, but it has significant differences, such as a requirement that code is compatible with Java standards and commercial derivative works are subject to licensing fees. The SCSL is not considered a free software license.
