= Jakarta EE =

Set of specifications extending Java SE

- Player software: Java
- Programming language(s): Java
- Application(s): Application server
- Status: Active
- License: Eclipse Public License or GNU General Public License w/Classpath exception
- Website: jakarta.ee

Jakarta EE, formerly Java Platform, Enterprise Edition (Java EE) and Java 2 Platform, Enterprise Edition (J2EE), is a set of specifications, extending Java SE with specifications for enterprise features such as distributed computing and web services. Jakarta EE applications are run on reference runtimes, which can be microservices or application servers, which handle transactions, security, scalability, concurrency and management of the components they are deploying.

Jakarta EE is defined by its specification. The specification defines APIs (application programming interface) and their interactions. As with other Java Community Process specifications, providers must meet certain conformance requirements in order to declare their products as Jakarta EE compliant.

Examples of contexts in which Jakarta EE referencing runtimes are used are: e-commerce, accounting, banking information systems.

== History ==
The platform created by Sun Microsystems was known as Java 2 Platform, Enterprise Edition or J2EE from version 1.2, until the name was changed to Java Platform, Enterprise Edition or Java EE in version 1.5.

After Sun was acquired in 2009, Java EE was maintained by Oracle under the Java Community Process. On September 12, 2017, Oracle Corporation announced that it would submit Java EE to the Eclipse Foundation. The Eclipse top-level project has been named Eclipse Enterprise for Java (EE4J). The Eclipse Foundation could not agree with Oracle over the use of javax and Java trademarks. Oracle owns the trademark for the name "Java" and the platform was renamed from Java EE to Jakarta EE. The name refers to the largest city on the island of Java and also the capital of Indonesia, Jakarta. The name should not be confused with the former Jakarta Project which fostered a number of current and former Java projects at the Apache Software Foundation.

Java enterprise platform history
Platform version	Release	Specification	Java SE Support	Important Changes
Jakarta EE 11	2025-06-26	11	Java SE 21; Java SE 17	Data
Jakarta EE 10	2022-09-22	10	Java SE 17; Java SE 11	Removal of deprecated items in Servlet, Faces, CDI and EJB (Entity Beans and Embeddable Container). CDI-Build Time.
Jakarta EE 9.1	2021-05-25	9.1	Java SE 11; Java SE 8	JDK 11 support
Jakarta EE 9	2020-12-08	9	Java SE 8	API namespace move from javax to jakarta
Jakarta EE 8	2019-09-10	8	Java SE 8	Full compatibility with Java EE 8
Java EE 8	2017-08-31	JSR 366	Java SE 8	HTTP/2 and CDI based Security
Java EE 7	2013-05-28	JSR 342	Java SE 7	WebSocket, JSON and HTML5 support
Java EE 6	2009-12-10	JSR 316	Java SE 6	CDI managed Beans and REST
Java EE 5	2006-05-11	JSR 244	Java SE 5	Java annotations and Generics in Java
J2EE 1.4	2003-11-11	JSR 151	J2SE 1.4	WS-I interoperable web services
J2EE 1.3	2001-09-24	JSR 58	J2SE 1.3	Java connector architecture
J2EE 1.2	1999-12-17	1.2	J2SE 1.2	Initial specification release

== Specifications ==
Jakarta EE includes several specifications that serve different purposes, like generating web pages, reading and writing from a database in a transactional way, and managing distributed queues.

The Jakarta EE APIs include several technologies that extend the functionality of the base Java SE APIs, such as Jakarta Enterprise Beans, connectors, servlets, Jakarta Server Pages and several web service technologies.

=== Web specifications ===
- Jakarta Servlet: defines how to manage HTTP requests, in a synchronous or asynchronous way. It is low level and other Jakarta EE specifications rely on it;
- Jakarta WebSocket: API specification that defines a set of APIs to service WebSocket connections;
- Jakarta Faces: a technology for constructing user interfaces out of components;
- Jakarta Expression Language (EL) is a simple language originally designed to satisfy the specific needs of web application developers. It is used specifically in Jakarta Faces to bind components to (backing) beans and in Contexts and Dependency Injection to named beans, but can be used throughout the entire platform.

=== Web service specifications ===
- Jakarta RESTful Web Services provides support in creating web services according to the Representational State Transfer (REST) architectural pattern;
- Jakarta JSON Processing is a set of specifications to manage information encoded in JSON format;
- Jakarta JSON Binding provides specifications to convert JSON information into or from Java classes;
- Jakarta XML Binding allows mapping XML into Java objects;
- Jakarta XML Web Services can be used to create SOAP web services.

=== Enterprise specifications ===
- Jakarta Activation (JAF) specifies an architecture to extend component Beans by providing data typing and bindings of such types.
- Jakarta Contexts and Dependency Injection (CDI) is a specification to provide a dependency injection container;
- Jakarta Enterprise Beans (EJB) specification defines a set of lightweight APIs that an object container (the EJB container) will support in order to provide transactions (using JTA), remote procedure calls (using RMI or RMI-IIOP), concurrency control, dependency injection and access control for business objects. This package contains the Jakarta Enterprise Beans classes and interfaces that define the contracts between the enterprise bean and its clients and between the enterprise bean and the ejb container.
- Jakarta Persistence (JPA) are specifications about object-relational mapping between relation database tables and Java classes.
- Jakarta Transactions (JTA) contains the interfaces and annotations to interact with the transaction support offered by Jakarta EE. Even though this API abstracts from the really low-level details in implementing the X/Open XA standard, the interfaces are also considered somewhat low-level and the average application developer in Jakarta EE is either assumed to be relying on transparent handling of transactions by the higher level EJB abstractions, or using the annotations provided by this API in combination with CDI managed beans.
- Jakarta Messaging (JMS) provides a common way for Java programs to create, send, receive and read an enterprise messaging system's messages.

=== Other specifications ===
- Jakarta Validation: This package contains the annotations and interfaces for the declarative validation support offered by the Jakarta Validation API. Jakarta Validation provides a unified way to provide constraints on beans (e.g. Jakarta Persistence model classes) that can be enforced cross-layer. In Jakarta EE, Jakarta Persistence honors bean validation constraints in the persistence layer, while JSF does so in the view layer.
- Jakarta Batch provides the means for batch processing in applications to run long running background tasks that possibly involve a large volume of data and which may need to be periodically executed.
- Jakarta Connectors is a Java-based tool for connecting application servers and enterprise information systems (EIS) as part of enterprise application integration (EAI). This is a low-level API aimed at vendors that the average application developer typically does not come in contact with.

== Web profile ==
In an attempt to limit the footprint of web containers, both in physical and in conceptual terms, the web profile was created, a subset of the Jakarta EE specifications. The Jakarta EE web profile comprises the following:

Specification	Java EE 6	Java EE 7	Java EE 8 Jakarta EE 8	Jakarta EE 9 Jakarta EE 9.1	Jakarta EE 10	Jakarta EE 11
Jakarta Servlet	3.0	3.1	4.0	5.0	6.0	6.1
Jakarta Server Pages (JSP)	2.2	2.3	2.3	3.0	3.1	4.0
Jakarta Expression Language (EL)	2.2	3.0	3.0	4.0	5.0	6.0
Jakarta Debugging Support for Other Languages (JSR-45)	1.0	1.0	1.0	2.0	2.0	2.0
Jakarta Standard Tag Library (JSTL)	1.2	1.2	1.2	2.0	3.0	3.0
Jakarta Faces	2.0	2.2	2.3	3.0	4.0	4.1
Jakarta RESTful Web Services (JAX-RS)	1.1	2.0	2.1	3.0	3.1	4.0
Jakarta WebSocket (WebSocket)	—N/a	1.0	1.1	2.0	2.1	2.2
Jakarta JSON Processing (JSON-P)	—N/a	1.0	1.1	2.0	2.1	2.1
Jakarta JSON Binding (JSON-B)	—N/a	—N/a	1.1	2.0	3.0	3.0
Jakarta Annotations (CA)	1.1	1.2	1.3	2.0	2.1	3.0
Jakarta Enterprise Beans (EJB)	3.1 Lite	3.2 Lite	3.2 Lite	4.0 Lite	4.0 Lite	4.0 Lite
Jakarta Transactions (JTA)	1.1	1.2	1.2	2.0	2.0	2.0
Jakarta Persistence (JPA)	2.0	2.1	2.2	3.0	3.1	3.2
Jakarta Bean Validation	1.0	1.1	2.0	3.0	3.0	3.1
Jakarta Managed Beans	1.0	1.0	1.0	2.0	—N/a	N/a
Jakarta Interceptors	1.1	1.2	1.2	2.0	2.1	2.2
Jakarta Contexts and Dependency Injection (CDI)	1.0	1.1	2.0	3.0	4.0	4.1
Jakarta Dependency Injection	1.0	1.0	1.0	2.0	2.0	2.0
Jakarta Security	—N/a	—N/a	1.0	2.0	3.0	4.0
Jakarta Authentication	—N/a	1.0	1.1	2.0	3.0	3.1
Jakarta Concurrency	—N/a	—N/a	—N/a	—N/a	3.0	3.1

== Certified referencing runtimes ==
Although by definition all Jakarta EE implementations provide the same base level of technologies (namely, the Jakarta EE spec and the associated APIs), they can differ considerably with respect to extra features (like connectors, clustering, fault tolerance, high availability, security, etc.), installed size, memory footprint, startup time, etc.

=== Jakarta EE ===
Referencing runtime	Developer	Jakarta EE 10 Platform	Jakarta EE 9/9.1 Platform Compatible Products	Jakarta EE 9/9.1 Web Profile Compatible Products	Jakarta EE 8 Platform Compatible Products	Jakarta EE 8 Web Profile Compatible Products	Licensing
GlassFish	Eclipse	Yes 7.1.1	Yes 6.0.0/ 6.1.0	Yes 6.0.0/ 6.1.0	Yes 5.1.0	Yes 5.1.0	Free software
Open Liberty	IBM	Yes 22.0.0.13-beta, 23.0.0.3	Yes 21.0.0.12	Yes 21.0.0.12	Yes 19.0.0.6, 20.0.0.3	Yes 19.0.0.6, 20.0.0.3	Free software
WebSphere Liberty	IBM	Yes 23.0.0.3	Yes 21.0.0.12	Yes 21.0.0.12	Yes 20.0.0.3	Yes 20.0.0.3	Proprietary software
WildFly	Red Hat	Yes 33.0.0.Final, 27.0.0.Alpha5	Yes 23.0.1-Preview/25.0.0-Preview	Yes 23.0.1-Preview/25.0.0-Preview	Yes 18.0.0	Yes 18.0.0	Free software
JBoss EAP	Red Hat	Yes 8.1.0, 8.0.0	No	No	Yes 7.3.0	Yes 7.3.0	Free software
TomEE	Apache	Yes 10.x	Yes 9.x	Yes 9.x	Yes 8.x	Yes 8.x	Free software
Payara Server	Payara Services Limited	Yes 6.2024.9, 6.2022.1 Alpha 4	Yes 6.2021.1 Alpha 1	No	Yes 5.22.0, 5.23.0	Yes 5.23.0	Free software
Thunisoft Application Server	Beijing Thunisoft Information Technology	No	Yes 3.0	No	Yes 2.8	No	Proprietary software
JEUS	TmaxSoft	No	No	No	Yes 8.5	No	Proprietary software
InforSuite Application Server	Shandong Cvicse Middleware	No	Yes 11	No	Yes 10	No	Proprietary software
WebOTX	NEC	Yes 12	No	No	Yes 11	No	Proprietary software

=== Java EE ===
Referencing runtime	Developer	Java EE 8 certified – Full	Java EE 8 certified – Web	Java EE 7 certified – Full	Java EE 7 certified – Web	Java EE 6 certified – Full Official Oracle page for Java EE Compatibility.	Java EE 6 certified – Web	Java EE 5 certified	J2EE 1.4 certified	Licensing
GlassFish server Open Source Edition	Oracle	Yes v5.0	Yes v5.0	Yes v4.x	Yes v4.x	Yes v3.x and upward	Yes v3.x Web Profile	Yes v2.1.x		Free software
Oracle GlassFish Server	Oracle					Yes v3 based on the open source GlassFish application server		Yes Sun Java System Application Server v9.0	Yes Sun Java System Application Server v8.2	Proprietary software
Oracle WebLogic Server	Oracle	Yes 14.1.1		Yes 12.2.1		Yes v12c		Yes v10.3.5.0	Yes v9	Proprietary software
WildFly	Red Hat	Yes v14.x	Yes v14.x	Yes v8.1	Yes v8.0.0.Final	Yes v7.1	Yes v6.0 and v7.0	Yes v5.1	Yes v4.x	Free software
JBoss Enterprise Application Platform	Red Hat	Yes v7.2		Yes v7.0	Yes v7.0	Yes v6.0		Yes v5		Proprietary software
IBM WebSphere Application Server	IBM			Yes v9.x	Yes v9.x	Yes v8		Yes v7	Yes	Proprietary software
IBM WebSphere Application Server Liberty	IBM	Yes v18.0.0.2	Yes v18.0.0.2	Yes v8.5.5.6	Yes v8.5.5.6		Yes v8.5.5			Proprietary software
Open Liberty	IBM	Yes v18.0.0.2	Yes v18.0.0.2							Free software
IBM WebSphere Application Server Community Edition	IBM					Yes v3.0		Yes v2.1		Proprietary software
Apache Geronimo	Apache					Yes v3.0-beta-1		Yes v2.0	Yes v1.0	Free software
JEUS	TmaxSoft			Yes v8		Yes v7		Yes v6	Yes v5	Proprietary software
Cosminexus Application Server	Hitachi			Yes v10.0		Yes v9				Proprietary software
Fujitsu Interstage Application Server	Fujitsu			Yes v12.0		Yes v1 Azure/v10.1		Yes		Proprietary software
WebOTX	NEC					Yes		Yes		Proprietary software
BES Application Server	Baolande				Yes v9.5					
Apache TomEE	Apache				No 7 (Java EE 7 like, but not certified)		Yes			Free software
Resin Server	Caucho						Yes v4.0		Yes	Proprietary software
Siwpas	OW2						Yes v6.0			Free software
JOnAS	OW2						Yes v5.3 rc1	Yes	Yes	Free software
SAP NetWeaver	SAP						Yes v2.x	Yes	Yes	Proprietary software
Oracle Containers for Java EE	Oracle							Yes		Proprietary software
Oracle iPlanet Web Server	Oracle								Yes Sun Java System Web Server	Proprietary software
Oracle Application Server 10g	Oracle								Yes	Proprietary software
Pramati Server	Pramati Technologies								Yes v5.0	Proprietary software
Trifork T4	Trifork								Yes	Proprietary software
Sybase Enterprise Application Server	Sybase								Yes	Proprietary software

== Jakarta Mail ==
Jakarta Mail (formerly JavaMail) is a Jakarta EE API used to send and receive email via SMTP, POP3 and IMAP. Jakarta Mail is built into the Jakarta EE platform, but also provides an optional package for use in Java SE.

The current version is 2.1.3, released on February 29, 2024. Another open source Jakarta Mail implementation exists (GNU JavaMail), which -while supporting only the obsolete JavaMail 1.3 specification- provides the only free NNTP backend, which makes it possible to use this technology to read and send news group articles.

As of 2019, the software is known as Jakarta Mail, and is part of the Jakarta EE brand (formerly known as Java EE). The reference implementation is part of the Eclipse Angus project.

Maven coordinates of the relevant projects required for operation are:

- mail API: jakarta.mail:jakarta.mail-api:2.1.3
- mail implementation: org.eclipse.angus:angus-mail:2.0.3
- multimedia extensions: jakarta.activation:jakarta.activation-api:2.1.3

Jakarta Mail is hosted as an open source project on Eclipse.org under its new name Jakarta Mail.

Most of the Jakarta Mail source code is licensed under the following licences:

- EPL-2.0
- GPL-2.0 with Classpath Exception license
- The source code for the demo programs is licensed under the BSD license

== Code sample ==
The code sample shown below demonstrates how various technologies in Java EE 7 are used together to build a web form for editing a user.

In Jakarta EE a (web) UI can be built using Jakarta Servlet, Jakarta Server Pages (JSP), or Jakarta Faces (JSF) with Facelets. The example below uses Faces and Facelets. Not explicitly shown is that the input components use the Jakarta EE Bean Validation API under the covers to validate constraints.

<html xmlns="http://www.w3.org/1999/xhtml"
      xmlns:h="http://xmlns.jcp.org/jsf/html" xmlns:f="http://xmlns.jcp.org/jsf/core">

    <f:metadata>
        <f:viewParam name="user_id" value="#{userEdit.user}" converter="#{userConvertor}" />
    </f:metadata>

    <h:body>

        <h:messages />

        <h:form>
            <h:panelGrid columns="2">
                <h:outputLabel for="firstName" value="First name" />
                <h:inputText id="firstName" value="#{userEdit.user.firstName}" label="First name" />

                <h:outputLabel for="lastName" value="Last name" />
                <h:inputText id="lastName" value="#{userEdit.user.lastName}" label="Last name" />

                <h:commandButton action="#{userEdit.saveUser}" value="Save" />
            </h:panelGrid>
        </h:form>

    </h:body>
</html>

=== Example Backing Bean class ===
To assist the view, Jakarta EE uses a concept called a "Backing Bean". The example below uses Contexts and Dependency Injection (CDI) and Jakarta Enterprise Beans (EJB).

package org.wikipedia.examples;

import java.io.Serializable;

import jakarta.faces.view.ViewScoped;
import jakarta.inject.Inject;
import jakarta.inject.Named;

@Named
@ViewScoped
public class UserEdit implements Serializable {
    private static final long serialVersionUID = 1L;

    private User user;

    @Inject
    private UserDAO userDAO;

    public String saveUser() {
        userDAO.save(this.user);
        addFlashMessage(String.format("User %d saved", this.user.getId()));

        return "users.xhtml?faces-redirect=true";
    }

    public void setUser(User user) {
        this.user = user;
    }

    public User getUser() {
        return user;
    }
}

=== Example Data Access Object class ===
To implement business logic, Jakarta Enterprise Beans (EJB) is the dedicated technology in Jakarta EE. For the actual persistence, JDBC or Jakarta Persistence (JPA) can be used. The example below uses EJB and JPA. Not explicitly shown is that JTA is used under the covers by EJB to control transactional behavior.

package org.wikipedia.examples;

import java.util.List;

import jakarta.ejb.Stateless;
import jakarta.persistence.EntityManager;
import jakarta.persistence.PersistenceContext;
import jakarta.persistence.TypedQuery;

@Stateless
public class UserDAO {
    @PersistenceContext
    private EntityManager entityManager;

    public void save(User user) {
        entityManager.persist(user);
    }

    public void update(User user) {
        entityManager.merge(user);
    }

    public List<User> getAll() {
        return entityManager.createNamedQuery("User.getAll", User.class)
            .getResultList();
    }
}

=== Example Entity class ===
For defining entity/model classes Jakarta EE provides the Jakarta Persistence (JPA), and for expressing constraints on those entities it provides the Bean Validation API. The example below uses both these technologies.

package org.wikipedia.examples;

import jakarta.persistence.Entity;
import jakarta.persistence.Id;
import jakarta.persistence.GeneratedValue;
import jakarta.persistence.GenerationType;

@Entity
public class User {
    @Id
    @GeneratedValue(strategy = IDENTITY)
    private Integer id;

    @Size(min = 2, message="First name too short")
    private String firstName;

    @Size(min = 2, message="Last name too short")
    private String lastName;

    public Integer getId() {
        return id;
    }

    public void setId(Integer id) {
        this.id = id;
    }

    public String getFirstName() {
        return firstName;
    }

    public void setFirstName(String firstName) {
        this.firstName = firstName;
    }

    public String getLastName() {
        return lastName;
    }

    public void setLastName(String lastName) {
        this.lastName = lastName;
    }
}

== See also ==
- Canigó (framework)
- Deployment descriptor
- Java BluePrints
- Java Research License
- Sun Community Source License
- Sun Java System Portal Server
- Web container
- J2ME
- Boost (C++ libraries)
- POCO C++ Libraries
