= List of Apache Software Foundation projects =

List of projects maintained by the Apache Software Foundation

This list of Apache Software Foundation projects includes the software development initiatives maintained by the Apache Software Foundation (ASF).

In addition to active projects, the ASF maintains several related areas:

- Incubator: for projects that are in the process of becoming full ASF projects.
- Attic: for ASF projects that have been formally retired.
- INFRA (Apache Infrastructure Team): responsible for managing and providing the technical infrastructure and services used by all Apache projects.

== Active projects ==
- Accumulo: secure implementation of Bigtable
- ActiveMQ: message broker supporting different communication protocols and clients, including a full Java Message Service (JMS) 1.1 client.
- AGE: PostgreSQL extension that provides graph database functionality in order to enable users of PostgreSQL to use graph query modeling in unison with PostgreSQL's existing relational model
- Airavata: a distributed system software framework to manage simple to composite applications with complex execution and workflow patterns on diverse computational resources
- Airflow: Python-based platform to programmatically author, schedule and monitor workflows
- Allura: Python-based open source implementation of a software forge
- Ambari: makes Hadoop cluster provisioning, managing, and monitoring dead simple
- Ant: Java-based build tool
  - AntUnit: The Ant Library provides Ant tasks for testing Ant task, it can also be used to drive functional and integration tests of arbitrary applications with Ant
  - Ivy: a very powerful dependency manager oriented toward Java dependency management, even though it could be used to manage dependencies of any kind
  - IvyDE: integrate Ivy in Eclipse with the IvyDE plugin
- APISIX: cloud-native microservices API gateway
- Archiva: Build Artifact Repository Manager
- Aries: OSGi Enterprise Programming Model
- Arrow: "A high-performance cross-system data layer for columnar in-memory analytics".
- AsterixDB: open source Big Data Management System
- Atlas: scalable and extensible set of core foundational governance services
- Avro: a data serialization system.
- Apache Axis Committee
  - Axis: open source, XML based Web service framework
  - Axis2: a service hosting and consumption framework that makes it easy to use SOAP and Web Services
  - Rampart: implementation of the WS-Security standard for the Axis2 Web services engine
  - Sandesha2: an Axis2 module implementing WS-RM.
- Bahir: extensions to distributed analytic platforms such as Apache Spark
- Beam, an uber-API for big data
- Bigtop: a project for the development of packaging and tests of the Apache Hadoop ecosystem.
- Bloodhound: defect tracker based on Trac
- BookKeeper: a reliable replicated log service
- Brooklyn: a framework for modelling, monitoring, and managing applications through autonomic blueprints
- BRPC: industrial-grade RPC framework for building reliable and high-performance services
- BuildStream: tool for building/integrating software stacks
- BVal: Bean Validation API Implementation
- Calcite: dynamic data management framework
- Camel: declarative routing and mediation rules engine which implements the Enterprise Integration Patterns using a Java-based domain specific language
- CarbonData: an indexed columnar data format for fast analytics on big data platform, e.g., Apache Hadoop, Apache Spark, etc.
- Cassandra: highly scalable second-generation distributed database
- Causeway(formerly Isis): a framework for rapidly developing domain-driven apps in Java
- Cayenne: Java ORM framework
- Celix: implementation of the OSGi specification adapted to C and C++
- CloudStack: software to deploy and manage cloud infrastructure
- Commons: reusable Java libraries and utilities too small to merit their own project
  - BCEL: Bytecode Engineering Library
  - Daemon: Commons Daemon
  - Jelly: Jelly is a Java and XML based scripting engine. Jelly combines the best ideas from JSTL, Velocity, DVSL, Ant and Cocoon all together in a simple yet powerful scripting engine
  - Logging: Commons Logging is a thin adapter allowing configurable bridging to other, well known logging systems
  - OGNL: Object Graph Navigation Library
- Community Development: project that creates and provides tools, processes, and advice to help open-source software projects improve their own community health
- Cordova: mobile development framework
- CouchDB: Document-oriented database
- Apache Creadur Committee
  - Rat: improves accuracy and efficiency when reviewing and auditing releases.
  - Tentacles: simplifies the job of reviewing repository releases consisting of large numbers of artefacts
  - Whisker: assists assembled applications to maintain correct legal documentation.
- cTAKES: clinical "Text Analysis Knowledge Extraction Software" to extract information from electronic medical record clinical free-text
- Curator: builds on ZooKeeper and handles the complexity of managing connections to the ZooKeeper cluster and retrying operations
- CXF: web services framework
- Daffodil: implementation of the Data Format Description Language (DFDL) used to convert between fixed format data and XML/JSON
- DataFu: collection of libraries for working with large-scale data in Hadoop
- DataFusion: analytical query engine
- DataSketches: open source, high-performance library of stochastic streaming algorithms commonly called "sketches" in the data sciences
- Apache DB Committee
  - Derby: pure Java relational database management system
  - JDO: Java Data Objects, persistence for Java objects
  - Torque: ORM for Java
- DeltaSpike: collection of JSR-299 (CDI) Extensions for building applications on the Java SE and EE platforms
- Apache Directory Committee
  - Directory: LDAP and Kerberos, entirely in Java.
  - Directory Server: an extensible, embeddable LDAP and Kerberos server, entirely in Java
  - Directory Studio: Eclipse based LDAP browser and directory client
  - Fortress: a standards-based authorization platform that implements ANSI INCITS 359 Role-Based Access Control (RBAC)
  - Kerby: Kerberos binding in Java
  - LDAP API: an SDK for directory access in Java
  - SCIMple is an implementation of SCIM v2.0 specification
- DolphinScheduler: a distributed ETL scheduling engine with powerful DAG visualization interface
- Doris: MPP-based interactive SQL data warehousing for reporting and analysis, good for both high-throughput scenarios and high-concurrency point queries
- Drill: software framework that supports data-intensive distributed applications for interactive analysis of large-scale datasets
- Druid: high-performance, column-oriented, distributed data store
- Dubbo: high-performance, lightweight, Java-based RPC framework
- ECharts: charting and data visualization library written in JavaScript
- Empire-db: a lightweight relational database abstraction layer and data persistence component
- EventMesh: dynamic cloud-native basic service runtime used to decouple the application and middleware layer
- Felix: implementation of the OSGi Release 5 core framework specification
- Fineract: Platform for Digital Financial Services
- Flagon: software tool usability testing platform
- Flex: cross-platform SDK for developing and deploying rich Internet applications.
- Flink: fast and reliable large-scale data processing engine.
- Flume: large scale log aggregation framework
- Apache Fluo Committee
  - Fluo: a distributed processing system that lets users make incremental updates to large data sets
  - Fluo Recipes: Apache Fluo Recipes build on the Fluo API to offer additional functionality to developers
  - Fluo YARN: a tool for running Apache Fluo applications in Apache Hadoop YARN
- FreeMarker: a template engine, i.e. a generic tool to generate text output based on templates. FreeMarker is implemented in Java as a class library for programmers
- Geode: low latency, high concurrency data management solutions
- Geronimo: Java EE server
- Gobblin: distributed data integration framework
- Gora: an open source framework that provide an in-memory data model and persistence for big data
- Griffin: an open source Data Quality solution for Big Data, which supports both batch and streaming mode. Originally developed by eBay
- Groovy: an object-oriented, dynamic programming language for the Java platform
- Guacamole: HTML5 web application for accessing remote desktops
- Gump: integration, dependencies, and versioning management
- Hadoop: Java software framework that supports data intensive distributed applications
- HAWQ: advanced enterprise SQL on Hadoop analytic engine
- HBase: Apache HBase software is the Hadoop database. Think of it as a distributed, scalable, big data store
- Helix: a cluster management framework for partitioned and replicated distributed resources
- Hive: the Apache Hive data warehouse software facilitates querying and managing large datasets residing in distributed storage.
- Hop: The Hop Orchestration Platform, or Apache Hop, aims to facilitate all aspects of data and metadata orchestration.
- HTTP Server: The Apache HTTP Server application 'httpd'
  - mod_python: module that integrates the Python interpreter into Apache server. Deprecated in favour of mod_wsgi.
- Apache HttpComponents: low-level Java libraries for HTTP
- Hudi: provides atomic upserts and incremental data streams on Big Data
- Iceberg: an open standard for analytic SQL tables, designed for high performance and ease of use.
- Ignite: an In-Memory Data Fabric providing in-memory data caching, partitioning, processing, and querying components
- Impala: a high-performance distributed SQL engine
- InLong: a one-stop integration framework for massive data that provides automatic, secure and reliable data transmission capabilities
- IoTDB: data store for managing large amounts of time series data in industrial applications
- Jackrabbit: implementation of the Java Content Repository API
- James: Java email and news server
- jclouds: open source multi-cloud toolkit for the Java platform
- Jena is an open source Semantic Web framework for Java
- JMeter: pure Java application for load and functional testing
- Johnzon: JSR-353 compliant JSON parsing; modules to help with JSR-353 as well as JSR-374 and JSR-367
- JSPWiki: A feature-rich and extensible WikiWiki engine built around the standard J2EE components (Java, servlets, JSP)
- Juneau: A toolkit for marshalling POJOs to a wide variety of content types using a common framework
- Kafka: a message broker software
- Karaf: an OSGi distribution for server-side applications.
- Kibble: a suite of tools for collecting, aggregating and visualizing activity in software projects.
- Knox: a REST API Gateway for Hadoop Services
- Kudu: a distributed columnar storage engine built for the Apache Hadoop ecosystem
- Kvrocks: a distributed key-value NoSQL database, supporting the rich data structure
- Kylin: distributed analytics engine
- Kyuubi: a distributed multi-tenant Thrift JDBC/ODBC server for large-scale data management, processing, and analytics, built on top of Apache Spark and designed to support more engines
- Libcloud: a standard Python library that abstracts away differences among multiple cloud provider APIs.
- Linkis: a computation middleware project, which decouples the upper applications and the underlying data engines, provides standardized interfaces (REST, JDBC, WebSocket etc.) to easily connect to various underlying engines (Spark, Presto, Flink, etc.)
- Apache Logging Services Committee
  - Chainsaw: a GUI log viewer.
  - Log4cxx: provides logging services for C++.
  - Log4j: Apache Log4j
  - Log4net: provides logging services for .NET.
  - Log4php: a logging framework for PHP.
- Apache Lucene Committee
  - Lucene Core: a high-performance, full-featured text search engine library
  - Solr: enterprise search server based on the Lucene Java search library
- Lucene.NET: a port of the Lucene search engine library, written in C# and targeted at .NET runtime users.
- MADlib: Scalable, Big Data, SQL-driven machine learning framework for Data Scientists
- Mahout: machine learning and data mining solution.
- ManifoldCF: Open-source software for transferring content between repositories or search indexes
- Maven: Java project management and comprehension tool
  - Doxia: a content generation framework, which supports many markup languages.
- Mesos: open-source cluster manager
- Apache MINA Committee
  - FtpServer: FTP server written entirely in Java
  - MINA: Multipurpose Infrastructure for Network Application, a framework to develop high performance and high scalability network applications.
  - SSHD: a 100% pure Java library to support the SSH protocols on both the client and server side SSHD
  - Vysper: aims to be a modular, full featured XMPP (Jabber) server. Vysper is implemented in Java
- Mnemonic: a transparent nonvolatile hybrid memory oriented library for Big data, High-performance computing, and Analytics
- Apache MyFaces Committee
  - MyFaces: JavaServer Faces implementation
  - Tobago: set of user interface components based on JSF
- Mynewt: embedded OS optimized for networking and built for remote management of constrained devices
- NetBeans: development environment, tooling platform, and application framework
- NiFi: easy to use, powerful, and reliable system to process and distribute data
- Nutch: a highly extensible and scalable open source web crawler
- NuttX: mature, real-time embedded operating system (RTOS)
- OFBiz: Open for Business: enterprise automation software
- Olingo: Client and Server for OData
- Oozie: a workflow scheduler system to manage Apache Hadoop jobs.
- OpenJPA: Java Persistence API Implementation
- OpenMeetings: video conferencing, instant messaging, white board and collaborative document editing application
- OpenNLP: natural language processing toolkit
- OpenOffice: an open-source, office-document productivity suite
- OpenWebBeans: Dependency Injection Platform
- OpenWhisk: distributed Serverless computing platform
- OSSIE: open, vendor-neutral specification for expressing business metrics, dimensions, and the relationships between them.
- ORC: columnar file format for big data workloads
- Ozone: scalable, redundant, and distributed object store for Hadoop
- Parquet: a general-purpose columnar storage format
- PDFBox: Java based PDF library (reading, text extraction, manipulation, viewer)
- Mod_perl: module that integrates the Perl interpreter into Apache server
- Pekko: toolkit and an ecosystem for building highly concurrent, distributed, reactive and resilient applications for Java and Scala
- Petri: deals with the assessment of, education in, and adoption of the Foundation's policies and procedures for collaborative development and the pros and cons of joining the Foundation
- Phoenix: SQL layer on HBase
- Pig: a platform for analyzing large data sets on Hadoop
- Pinot: a column-oriented, open-source, distributed data store written in Java
- Pivot: a platform for building rich internet applications in Java
- PLC4X: Universal API for communicating with programmable logic controllers
- Apache POI Committee
  - POI: Poor Obfuscation Implementation, a library for reading and writing Microsoft Office formats
  - XMLBeans: XML–Java binding tool
- APR: Apache Portable Runtime, a portability library written in C
- Portals: web portal related software
- Pulsar: distributed pub-sub messaging system originally created at Yahoo
- Qpid: AMQP messaging system in Java and C++
- Ranger: a framework to enable, monitor and manage comprehensive data security across the Hadoop platform
- Ratis: Java implementation for RAFT consensus protocol
- RocketMQ: a fast, low latency, reliable, scalable, distributed, easy to use message-oriented middleware, especially for processing large amounts of streaming data
- Roller: a full-featured, multi-user and group blog server suitable for both small and large blog sites
- Royale: improving developer productivity in creating applications for wherever JavaScript runs (and other runtimes)
- Rya: cloud-based RDF triple store that supports SPARQL queries
- Samza: Stream Processing Framework
- Santuario: XML Security in Java and C++
- SDAP: integrated data analytic center for Big Science problems
- SeaTunnel: a very easy-to-use ultra-high-performance distributed data integration platform that supports real-time synchronization of massive data
- Sedona: big geospatial data processing engine
- Serf: high performance C-based HTTP client library built upon the Apache Portable Runtime (APR) library
- ServiceComb: microservice framework that provides a set of tools and components to make development and deployment of cloud applications easier
- ServiceMix: enterprise service bus that supports JBI and OSGi
- ShardingSphere: related to a database clustering system providing data sharding, distributed transactions, and distributed database management
- ShenYu: Java native API Gateway for service proxy, protocol conversion and API governance
- Shiro: a simple to use Java Security Framework
- SINGA: a distributed deep learning library
- Spatial Information System (SIS): A library for developing geospatial applications
- SkyWalking: application performance management and monitoring (APM)
- Sling: innovative Web framework based on JCR and OSGi
- Solr: Full Text search server
- SpamAssassin: email filter used to identify spam
- Spark: open source cluster computing framework
- Steve: STeVe is a collection of online voting tools, used by the ASF, to handle STV and other voting methods
- Storm: a distributed real-time computation system.
- StreamPipes: self-service (Industrial) IoT toolbox to enable non-technical users to connect, analyze and explore (Industrial) IoT data streams
- Streams: Interoperability of online profiles and activity feeds
- Struts: Java web applications framework
- Submarine: Cloud Native Machine Learning Platform
- Subversion: open source version control (client/server) system
- Superset: enterprise-ready web application for data exploration, data visualization and dashboarding
- Synapse: a lightweight and high-performance Enterprise Service Bus (ESB)
- Syncope: an Open Source system for managing digital identities in enterprise environments.
- SystemDS: scalable machine learning
- Tapestry: component-based Java web framework
- Apache Tcl Committee
  - Tcl integration for Apache httpd
  - Rivet: Server-side Tcl programming system combining ease of use and power
  - Websh: Websh is a rapid development environment for building powerful, fast, and reliable web applications in Tcl
- Tez: an effort to develop a generic application framework which can be used to process arbitrarily complex directed-acyclic graphs (DAGs) of data-processing tasks and also a re-usable set of data-processing primitives which can be used by other projects
- Thrift : Interface definition language and binary communication protocol that is used to define and create services for numerous languages
- Tika: content analysis toolkit for extracting metadata and text from digital documents of various types, e.g., audio, video, image, office suite, web, mail, and binary
- TinkerPop: A graph computing framework for both graph databases (OLTP) and graph analytic systems (OLAP)
- Tomcat: web container for serving servlets and JSP
  - Reusable Dialog Components (RDC) Taglib: A framework for creating JSP taglibs that aid in rapid development of voice and multimodal applications
- TomEE: an all-Apache Java EE 6 Web Profile stack for Apache Tomcat
- Traffic Control: Built around Apache Traffic Server as the caching software, Traffic Control implements all the core functions of a modern CDN.
- Traffic Server: HTTP/1.1 compliant caching proxy server.
- Turbine: a servlet based framework that allows Java developers to quickly build web applications
- TVM: an end to end machine learning compiler framework for CPUs, GPUs and accelerators
- UIMA: unstructured content analytics framework
- Unomi: reference implementation of the OASIS customer data platform specification
- VCL: a cloud computing platform for provisioning and brokering access to dedicated remote compute resources.
- Apache Velocity Committee:
  - Anakia: an XML transformation tool which uses JDOM and Velocity to transform XML documents into multiple formats.
  - Texen: a general purpose text generating utility based on Apache Velocity and Apache Ant.
  - Velocity: Java template creation engine
  - Apache Velocity DVSL: a tool modeled after XSLT and intended for general XML transformations using the Velocity Template Language.
  - Apache Velocity Tools: tools and infrastructure for the template engine
- Apache Web Services Committee
  - Axiom: an XML object model supporting deferred parsing.
  - Woden: used to develop a Java class library for reading, manipulating, creating and writing WSDL documents.
- Whimsy: tools that display and visualize various bits of data related to ASF organizations and processes.
- Wicket: component-based Java web framework
- Xalan: XSLT processors in Java and C++
- Xerces: validating XML parser
- Apache XML Graphics Committee
  - Batik: pure Java library for SVG content manipulation
  - FOP: Java print formatter driven by XSL formatting objects (XSL-FO); supported output formats include PDF, PS, PCL, AFP, XML (area tree representation), Print, AWT and PNG, and to a lesser extent, RTF and TXT
  - XML Graphics Commons: common components for Apache Batik and Apache FOP
- Yetus: a collection of libraries and tools that enable contribution and release processes for software projects
- YuniKorn: standalone resource scheduler responsible for scheduling batch jobs and long-running services on large scale distributed systems
- Zeppelin: a collaborative data analytics and visualization tool for distributed, general-purpose data processing systems
- ZooKeeper: coordination service for distributed applications

== Retired projects ==
A retired project is one which has been closed down on the initiative of the board, the project its PMC, the PPMC or the IPMC for various reasons. It is no longer developed at the Apache Software Foundation and does not have any other duties.

- Abdera: implementation of the Atom Syndication Format and Atom Publishing Protocol
- ACE: a distribution framework that allows central management and distribution of software components, configuration data and other artefacts to target systems
- Any23: Anything To Triples (Any23) is a library, a web service and a command line tool that extracts structured data in RDF format from a variety of Web documents
- Apex: Enterprise-grade unified stream and batch processing engine
- Aurora: Mesos framework for long-running services and cron jobs
- AxKit: XML Application Server for Apache. It provided on-the-fly conversion from XML to any format, such as HTML, WAP or text using either W3C standard techniques, or flexible custom code
- Beehive: Java visual object model
- Buildr: a build system for Java-based applications, including support for Scala, Groovy and a growing number of JVM languages and tools
- Chemistry: provides open source implementations of the Content Management Interoperability Services (CMIS) specification
- Chukwa: Chukwa is an open source data collection system for monitoring large distributed systems
- Clerezza: a service platform which provides a set of functionality for management of semantically linked data accessible through RESTful Web Services and in a secured way
- Click: simple and easy-to-use Java Web Framework
- Cocoon: XML publishing framework
- Continuum: continuous integration server
- Crimson: Java XML parser which supports XML 1.0 via various APIs
- Crunch: Provides a framework for writing, testing, and running MapReduce pipelines
- Deltacloud: provides common front-end APIs to abstract differences between cloud providers
- DeviceMap: device Data Repository and classification API
- DirectMemory: off-heap cache for the Java Virtual Machine
- DRAT: large scale code license analysis, auditing and reporting
- Eagle: open source analytics solution for identifying security and performance issues instantly on big data platforms
- ECS: API for generating elements for various markup languages
- ESME: secure and highly scalable microsharing and micromessaging platform that allows people to discover and meet one another and get controlled access to other sources of information, all in a business process context
- Etch: cross-platform, language- and transport-independent RPC-like messaging framework
- Excalibur: Java inversion of control framework including containers and components
- Falcon: data governance engine
- Forrest: documentation framework based upon Cocoon
- Giraph: scalable Graph Processing System
- Hama: Hama is an efficient and scalable general-purpose BSP computing engine
- Harmony: Java SE 5 and 6 runtime and development kit
- HiveMind: services and configuration microkernel
- iBATIS: Persistence framework which enables mapping SQL queries to POJOs
- Jakarta: server side Java, including its own set of subprojects
- Jakarta Cactus: simple test framework for unit testing server-side Java code
- Joshua: statistical machine translation toolkit
- Apache jUDDI Committee
  - Scout: Apache Scout is an implementation of the JSR 93 (JAXR).
- Labs: a place for innovation where committees of the foundation can experiment with new ideas
- Lens: Unified Analytics Interface
- Lenya: content management system (CMS) based on Apache Cocoon
- Lucy: search engine library that provides full-text search for dynamic programming languages
- Marmotta: An Open Platform for Linked Data
- MetaModel: provides a common interface for discovery, exploration of metadata and querying of different types of data sources.
- Metron: Real-time big data security
- MRUnit: Java library that helps developers unit test Apache Hadoop map reduce jobs
- MXNet: Deep learning programming framework
- ODE: Apache ODE is a WS-BPEL implementation that supports web services orchestration using flexible process definitions.
- ObJectRelationalBridge (OJB): Object/Relational mapping tool that allowed transparent persistence for Java Objects against relational databases
- Oltu - Parent: OAuth protocol implementation in Java
- Onami: project focused on the development and maintenance of a set of Google Guice extensions not provided out of the box by the library itself
- OODT: Object Oriented Data Technology, a data management framework for capturing and sharing data
- Open Climate Workbench: A comprehensive suite of algorithms, libraries, and interfaces designed to standardize and streamline the process of interacting with large quantities of observational data and conducting regional climate model evaluations
- ORO: Regular Expression engine supporting various dialects
- Polygene: community based effort exploring Composite Oriented Programming for domain centric application development
- PredictionIO: PredictionIO is an open source Machine Learning Server built on top of state-of-the-art open source stack, that enables developers to manage and deploy production-ready predictive services for various kinds of machine learning tasks.
- REEF: A scale-out computing fabric that eases the development of Big Data applications on top of resource managers such as Apache YARN and Mesos
- Regexp: Regular Expression engine
- River: provides a standards-compliant JINI service
- Sentry: Fine grained authorization to data and metadata in Apache Hadoop
- Shale: web application framework based on JavaServer Faces
- Shindig: OpenSocial container; helps start hosting OpenSocial apps quickly by providing the code to render gadgets, proxy requests, and handle REST and RPC requests
- Sqoop: a tool designed for efficiently transferring bulk data between Apache Hadoop and structured datastores such as relational databases
- STDCXX: collection of algorithms, containers, iterators, and other fundamental components of every piece of software, implemented as C++ classes, templates, and functions essential for writing C++ programs
- Stanbol: Software components for semantic content management
- Stratos: Platform-as-a-Service (PaaS) framework
- Tajo: relational data warehousing system. It using the hadoop file system as distributed storage.
- Tiles: templating framework built to simplify the development of web application user interfaces.
- Trafodion: Webscale SQL-on-Hadoop solution enabling transactional or operational workloads on Apache Hadoop
- Tuscany: SCA implementation, also providing other SOA implementations
- Twill: Use Apache Hadoop YARN's distributed capabilities with a programming model that is similar to running threads
- Usergrid: an open-source Backend-as-a-Service ("BaaS" or "mBaaS") composed of an integrated distributed NoSQL database, application layer and client tier with SDKs for developers looking to rapidly build web and/or mobile applications
- VXQuery: Apache VXQuery implements a parallel XML Query processor.
- Wave: online real-time collaborative editing
- Whirr: set of libraries for running cloud services
- Wink: RESTFul web services based on JAX-RS specification
- Wookie: parser, server and plugins for working with W3C Packaged Web Apps
- WS Muse: implementation of the WS-ResourceFramework (WSRF), WS-BaseNotification (WSN), and WS-DistributedManagement (WSDM) specifications
- Xang: XML Web Framework that aggregated multiple data sources, made that data URL addressable and defined custom methods to access that data
- Xindice: XML Database
- Zipkin: distributed tracing system
- OpenCMIS: Collection of Java libraries, frameworks and tools around the CMIS specification for document interoperability.

The above may be incomplete, as the list of retired projects changes.

== See also ==
- List of Eclipse projects
- List of Eclipse-based software
- List of free and open-source software organizations

== External list ==
- Apache Software projects by category
