= Apache Calcite =

Open-source data management framework

- Developer: Apache Software Foundation
- Initial release: June 27, 2014; 11 years ago
- Stable release: 1.37.0 (May 6, 2024; 20 months ago) [±]
- Repository: Calcite Repository
- Written in: Java
- Operating system: Cross-platform
- Platform: Java
- Type: SQL database framework
- License: Apache License 2.0
- Website: calcite.apache.org

Apache Calcite is an open source framework for building databases and data management systems. It includes a SQL parser, an API for building expressions in relational algebra, and a query planning engine. As a framework, Calcite does not store its own data or metadata, but instead allows external data and metadata to be accessed by means of plug-ins.

Several other Apache projects use Calcite. Hive uses Calcite for cost-based query optimization; Drill and Kylin use Calcite for SQL parsing and optimization; Samza and Storm use Calcite for streaming SQL. As of August 2016, Apex, Phoenix and Flink have projects under development that use Calcite.
