= Apache Guacamole =

Open-source remote desktop software

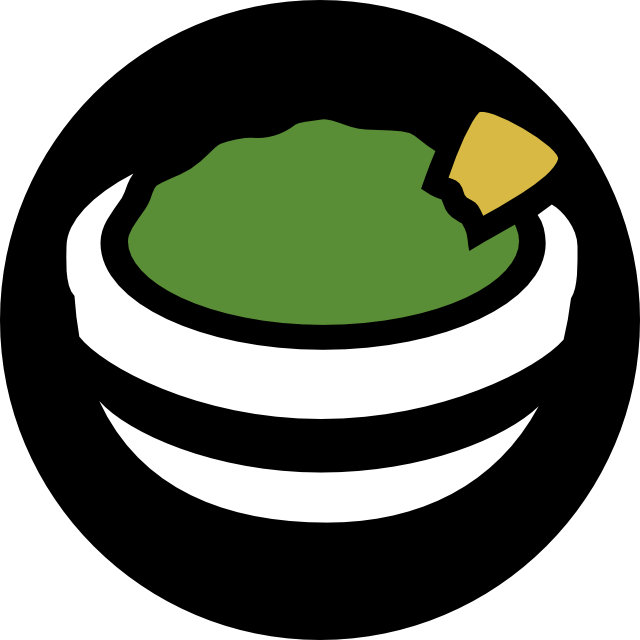
- Developer: Apache Software Foundation
- Initial release: March 17, 2010; 15 years ago
- Stable release: 1.6.0 / June 22, 2025; 6 months ago
- Repository: guacamole-server; guacamole-client
- Written in: C and Java (server), JavaScript (client)
- Operating system: Server: Linux / UNIX; Client: Web browsers that support HTML5
- Type: Remote Desktop Gateway
- License: Apache License 2.0
- Website: Official Website

Apache Guacamole is a clientless remote desktop gateway allowing users to control remote computers or virtual machines via a web browser, and allows administrators to dictate how and whether users can connect using an extensible authentication and authorization system. Destination machines can be kept isolated behind Guacamole and need not be reachable over the internet. It is published under the Apache License 2.0, available for multiple platforms and maintained by the Apache Software Foundation.

Remote access is performed via the guacd component, which uses the RDP, VNC or SSH remote protocols to access resources. Guacamole is clientless and doesn't require an agent to be installed on the resources being accessed. The fact that the client runs on web browsers allows users to connect to their remote desktops without installing a remote desktop client.

== Components ==
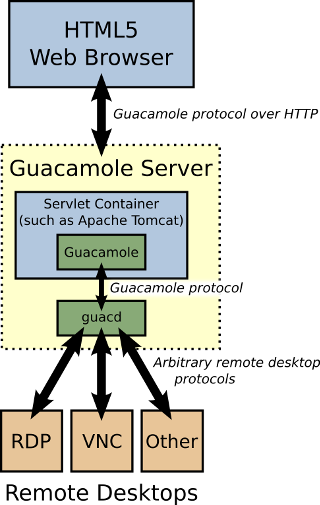
Architecture of Apache Guacamole

Guacamole is made up of multiple components: a web application that is served to users, and a backend service ("guacd") that dynamically translates and optimizes native protocols into the Guacamole protocol. The part of Guacamole that a user interacts with is the web application.

=== Web Application ===
The web application provides the user interface, authentication, and authorization system. It does not implement any remote desktop protocol, but instead relies on guacd to translate remote desktop protocols into the Guacamole protocol. The server side of the web application is written in Java and runs beneath a servlet container like Apache Tomcat or Jetty. The client side of the web application is written in JavaScript and runs within the web browser.

=== guacd ===
guacd services requests to connect to remote desktops from the web application. It dynamically loads support for remote desktop protocols so that neither guacd nor the web application need to understand the specifics of any one remote desktop protocol. guacd and all client plugins use a shared library, libguac, to abstract away the Guacamole protocol and communication with the web application.

== History ==
Guacamole was created in 2010 by Michael Jumper as an HTML5 VNC client leveraging components of a browser-based telnet client called "RealMint". The company Glyptodon LLC formed to support and develop the project, and donated the project to the Apache Software Foundation in 2016 where it entered incubation. In 2017, Guacamole completed incubation and became the Apache Guacamole top-level project.

As an Apache Software Foundation project, Guacamole is licensed under the Apache License and is developed by a community of contributors. Development discussions and support take place on the project's mailing lists, and contributions are made through opening pull requests against the project's GitHub repositories. The project follows responsible disclosure practices and provides a private list for reporting and addressing issues with security implications.

=== Timeline ===
Version	Release date
1.6.0	2025-06-22
1.5.5	2024-04-05
1.5.4	2023-12-07
1.5.3	2023-07-31
1.5.2	2023-05-25
1.5.1	2023-04-13
1.5.0	2023-02-18
1.4.0	2022-01-01
1.3.0	2021-01-01
1.2.0	2020-06-28
1.1.0	2020-01-29
1.0.0	2019-01-08
0.9.14	2018-01-18
0.9.13-incubating	2017-07-30
0.9.12-incubating	2017-04-01
0.9.11-incubating	2017-02-02
0.9.10-incubating	2016-12-29
0.9.9	2015-12-18
0.9.8	2015-09-09
0.9.7	2015-06-10
0.9.6	2015-03-30
0.9.5	2015-02-16
0.9.4	2015-01-06
0.9.3	2014-09-30
0.9.2	2014-07-21
0.9.1	2014-05-23
0.8.4	2014-05-23
0.9.0	2014-03-28
0.8.3	2013-08-28
0.8.2	2013-07-15
Legend: Unsupported Supported Latest version

== Literature ==
- Kalyan Ram, S. Arun Kumar, S. Prathap, B. Mahesh & B. Mallikarjuna Sarma: Remote Laboratories: For Real Time Access to Experiment Setups with Online Session Booking, Utilizing a Database and Online Interface with Live Streaming, in: Engineering & Internet of Things, Conference paper, p. 190—204
