= EGroupware =

Open source groupware software for businesses

EGroupware application

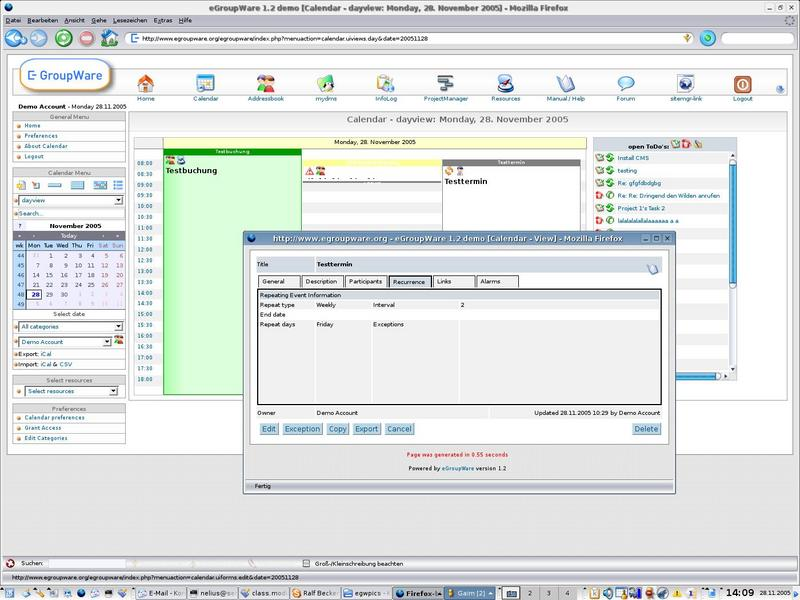
- EGroupware calendar screen
- Developer: Open Source Project
- Stable release: 26.4.20260424 / April 24, 2026; 5 months ago
- Written in: PHP
- Operating system: Cross-platform
- Available in: Various
- Type: Groupware
- License: GNU General Public License version 2
- Website: www.egroupware.org
- Repository: github.com/EGroupware/egroupware

EGroupware is free open-source groupware collaboration software intended for businesses from small to enterprise. Its primary functions allow users to manage contacts, appointments, projects and to-do lists. The project releases its software under the terms of GNU General Public License (GPL).

It is used either via its native web-interface, making access platform-independent, or by using different supported groupware clients, such as Kontact, Novell Evolution, or Microsoft Outlook. It can also be used by mobile phone or PDA via SyncML.

It has translations for more than 25 languages, including right-to-left language support.

== History ==
EGroupware is the most current manifestation of a chain of projects. The original project was called webdistro. In 2000 development on the project phpgroupware began, which was based on webdistro; and in 2003 the EGroupware fork was born. EGroupware has a very pronounced community character compared with its predecessors.

There is an EGroupware constitution, adopted in 2005, which guarantees freedom and security to the community and establishes admin elections.

For a short time Tine 2.0 was an official subproject of EGroupware. The goal of the subproject was the development of future technologies for the EGroupware project. Due to internal disagreements, the projects EGroupware and Tine 2.0 had separated from each other in February 2008.

In July 2009 the first professional Version of EGroupware was made available. It was being sold as a software subscription. This product line, called "EGroupware Premium Line" (EPL) includes a maintenance agreement for the source code and corresponding RPMs, that enables automatic updates.

Version 14.2 ist became available in December 2014. E-Share-Option: Since version 14.2 EGroupware Filemanager offers a file sharing option for a data exchange. It includes, for example, the option to send links to read or edit files to persons that do not use EGroupware. Beside that, files can be moved via drag and drop. Filemanager is used as an alternative to the filehosting service Dropbox. Home Screen: The Home Screen is a virtual pinboard, that makes important contacts, projects or tasks always available for the user. Mobile Template: The third update in 14.2 is the mobile template, that has been optimized for small screens and touch handling. It enables the usage of EGroupware on tablets and supports swipe gestures and an adaptation of the format while turning the device.

Version 16.1 was released in 2016. It included a new calendar and further improvements of the mobile template.

Version 20.1 was released on 12 August 2020. It integrated a new smallPART application for video-based learning & teaching. A push server was implemented and the source code was converted to TypeScript. Even before the release of version 20.1, the video conferencing solution Jitsi and the web remote desktop solution Apache Guacamole were integrated due to the Corona pandemic.

Version 21.1 was released on 25 May 2021. The module smallPART (video-based learning tool) now supported tests and exams with single-choice, Multiple choice and open text questions. New additions include an integrated Kanban board and cloud telephone system integration (CTI). Further innovations included EGroupware Firewall, Dark Mode, File sharing for internal users, and EGroupware Mail server.

== Technology ==
EGroupware is developed in the script language PHP/TypeScript and is therefore platform-independent (Linux, Windows). Open source databases (MariaDB, PostgreSQL or also MySQL) can be used as databases. Authentication can be done against the own user accounts in SQL as well as LDAP, mail server, Active Directory (AD), CAS, SAML 2.0/Shibboleth/SimpleSAMLphp and others.

Comparable programs are proprietary groupware servers such as Microsoft Exchange or Lotus Domino.

EGroupware can manage mail servers (Dovecot, Cyrus). User administration, e-mail accounts, absence notes/filters(via Sieve), mail aliases, quotas and forwardings are directly administrable in EGroupware or can be set by the user. A suitable e-mail server is offered as an installation package.

EGroupware can be synchronised with Apple- and Android devices. Appointments, addressbook entries and tasks from Infolog application can be synchronised. ESync and CalDAV are thereby used as protocols.

=== Applications and functions ===
- Contact-manager using an SQL database or LDAP
- Calendar (including support for scheduling of groups, resources and contacts)
- Integrated IMAP webmail client (FelaMiMail)
- Infolog, an application for tasks and notes
- File manager
- File sharing
- Kanban board
- Knowledge base
- Element based project manager highly integrated with all other apps
- Resources management (inventory) and booking tool integrated into EGroupware calendar
- Wiki
- SiteMgr: web based authoring system with fine granulated access control lists
- CalDAV and CardDAV server
- News
- Time-tracker application
- Bookmarks
- Tracking system

Other included/connected applications:

- Chat (Rocket.Chat)
- Video conference (Jitsi/BigBlueButton)
- Remote desktop (Apache Guacamole)
- Online office suite (Collabora Online)
- smallPART

== See also ==
- List of collaborative software § Open source software compares its features with others
- List of project management software

== Screenshots ==
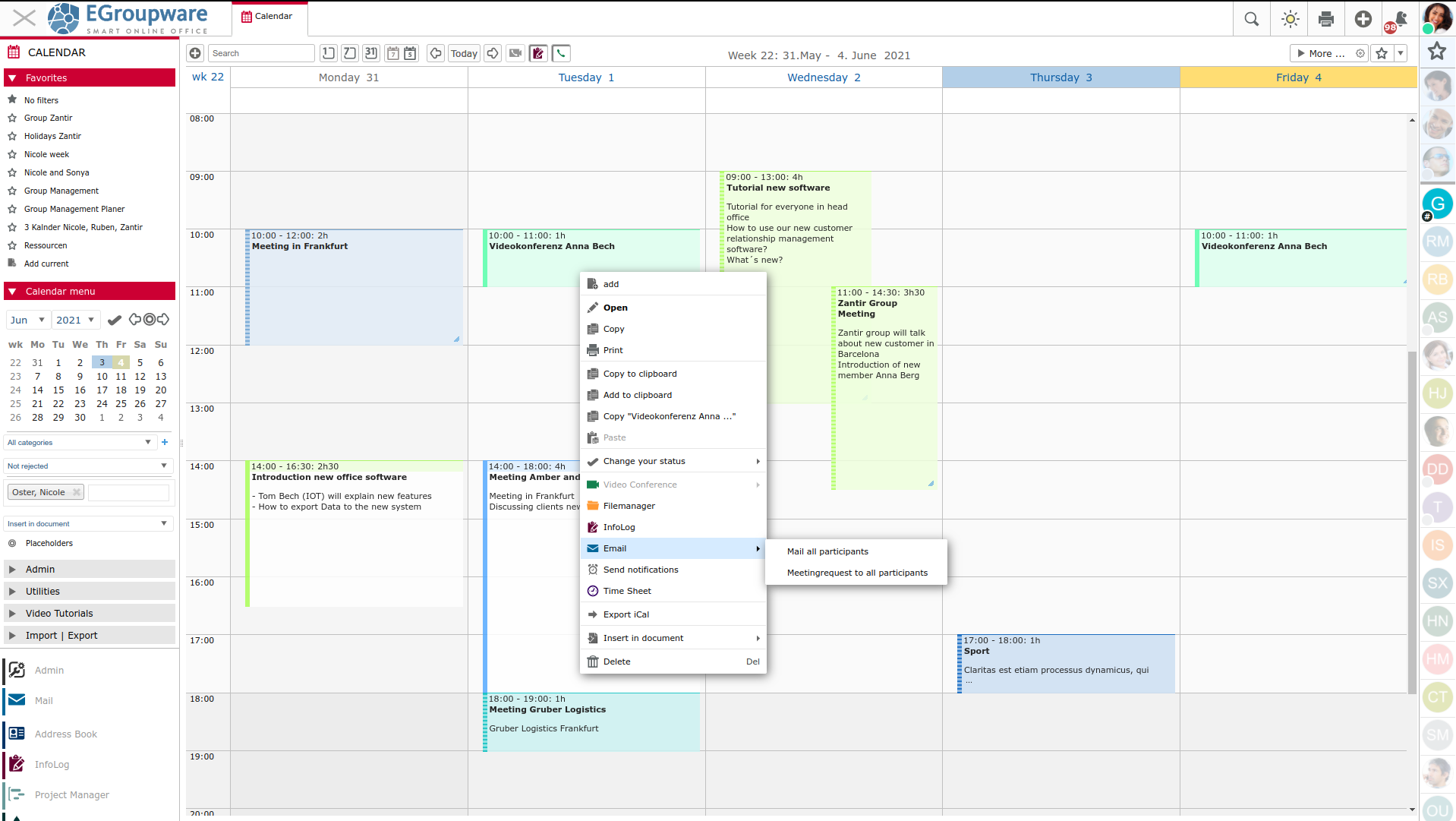
EGroupware Calendar in the desktop web browser with context menu

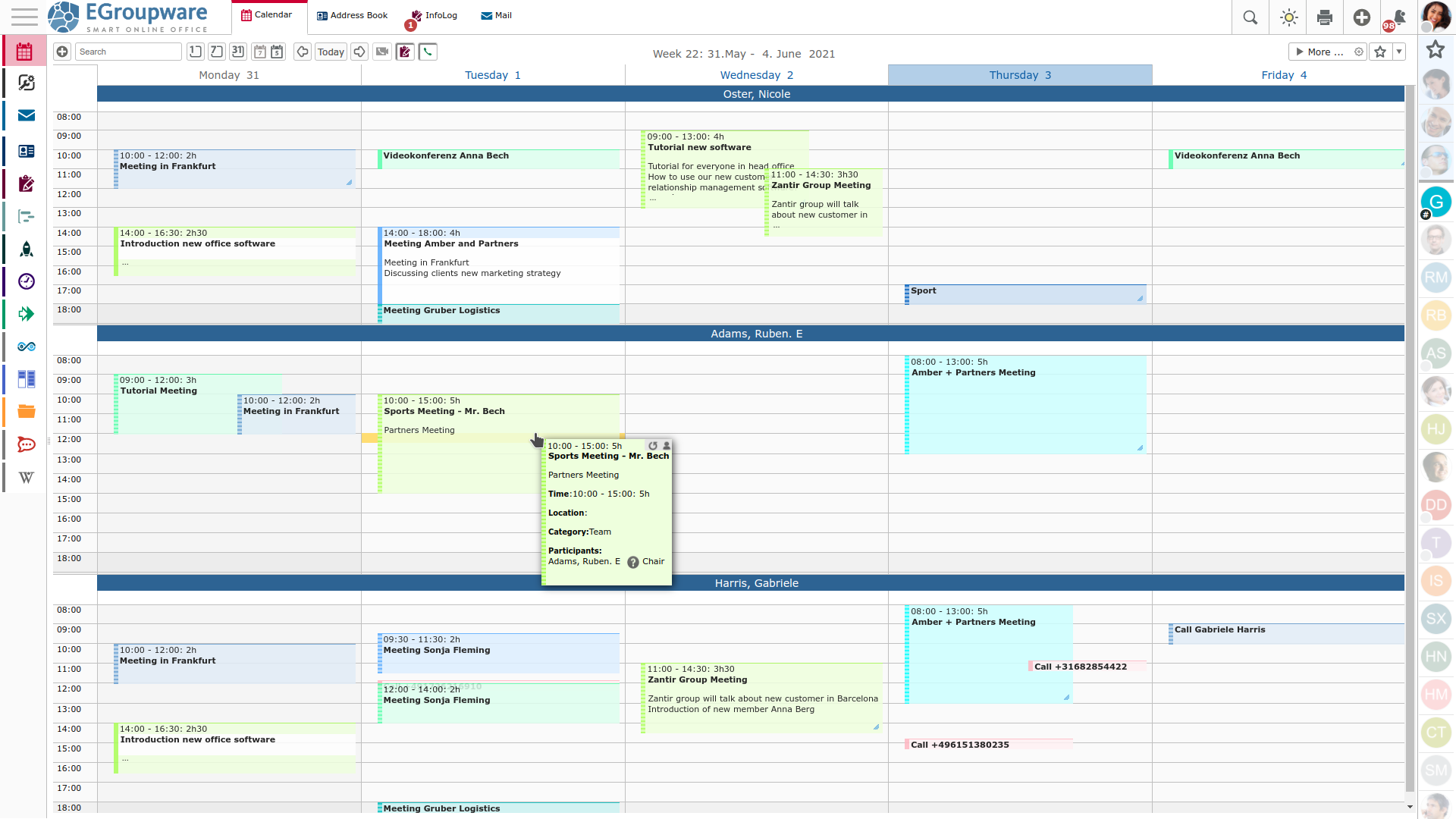
EGroupware Calendar in the desktop web browser - planner by user with tooltip

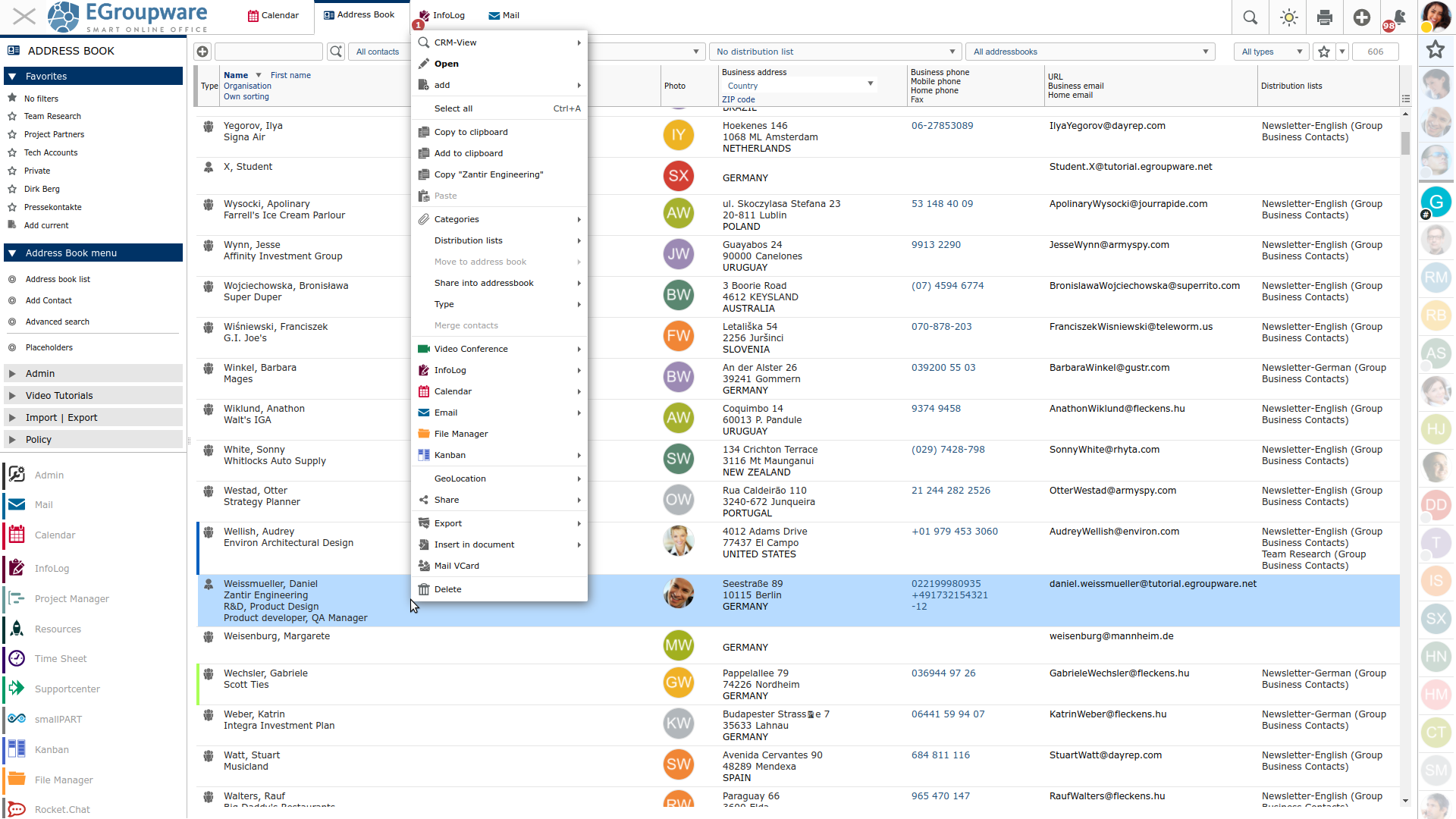
EGroupware Address book in the desktop web browser with context menu

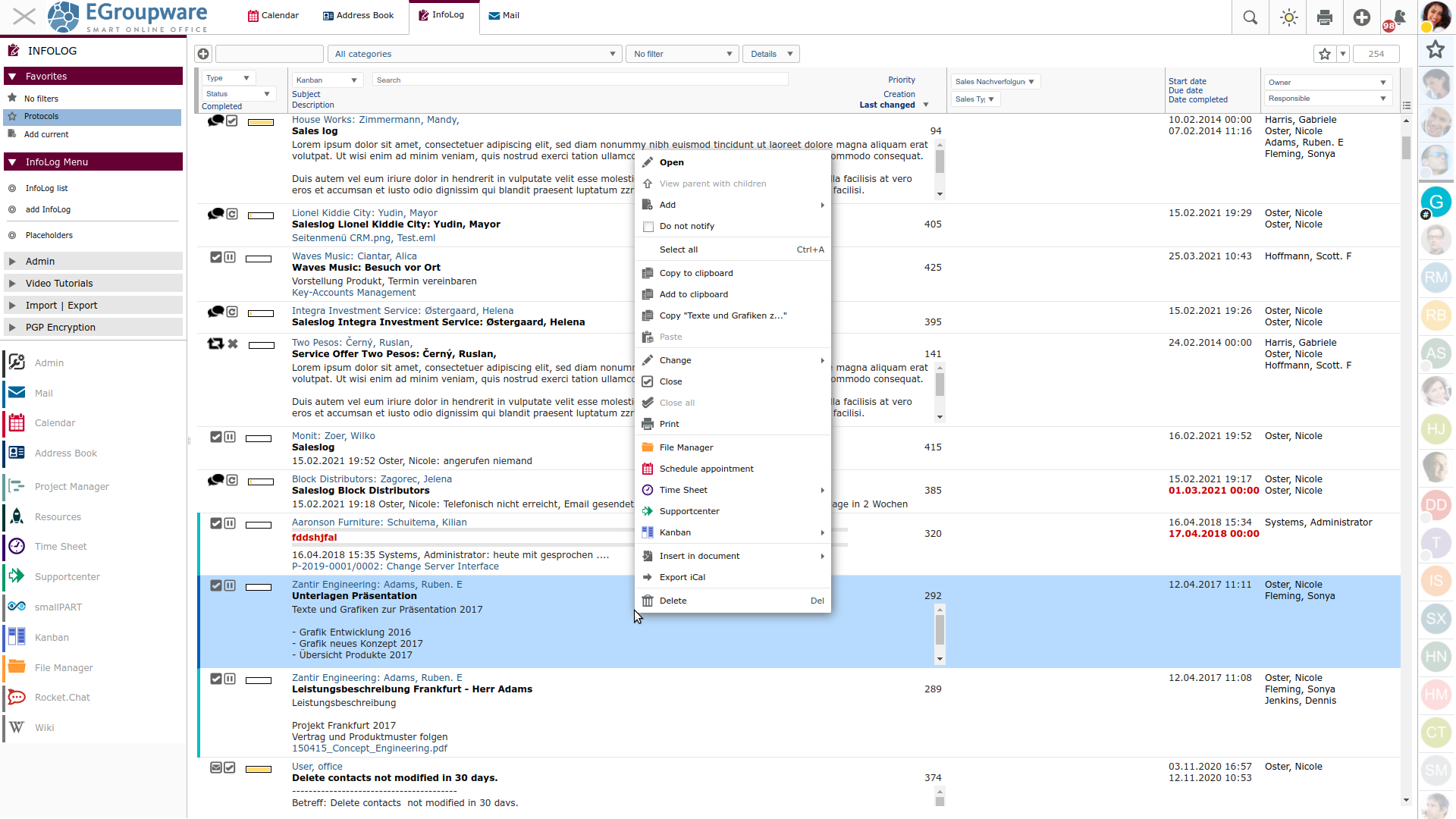
EGroupware InfoLog (tasks, notes, ...) in the desktop web browser with context menu

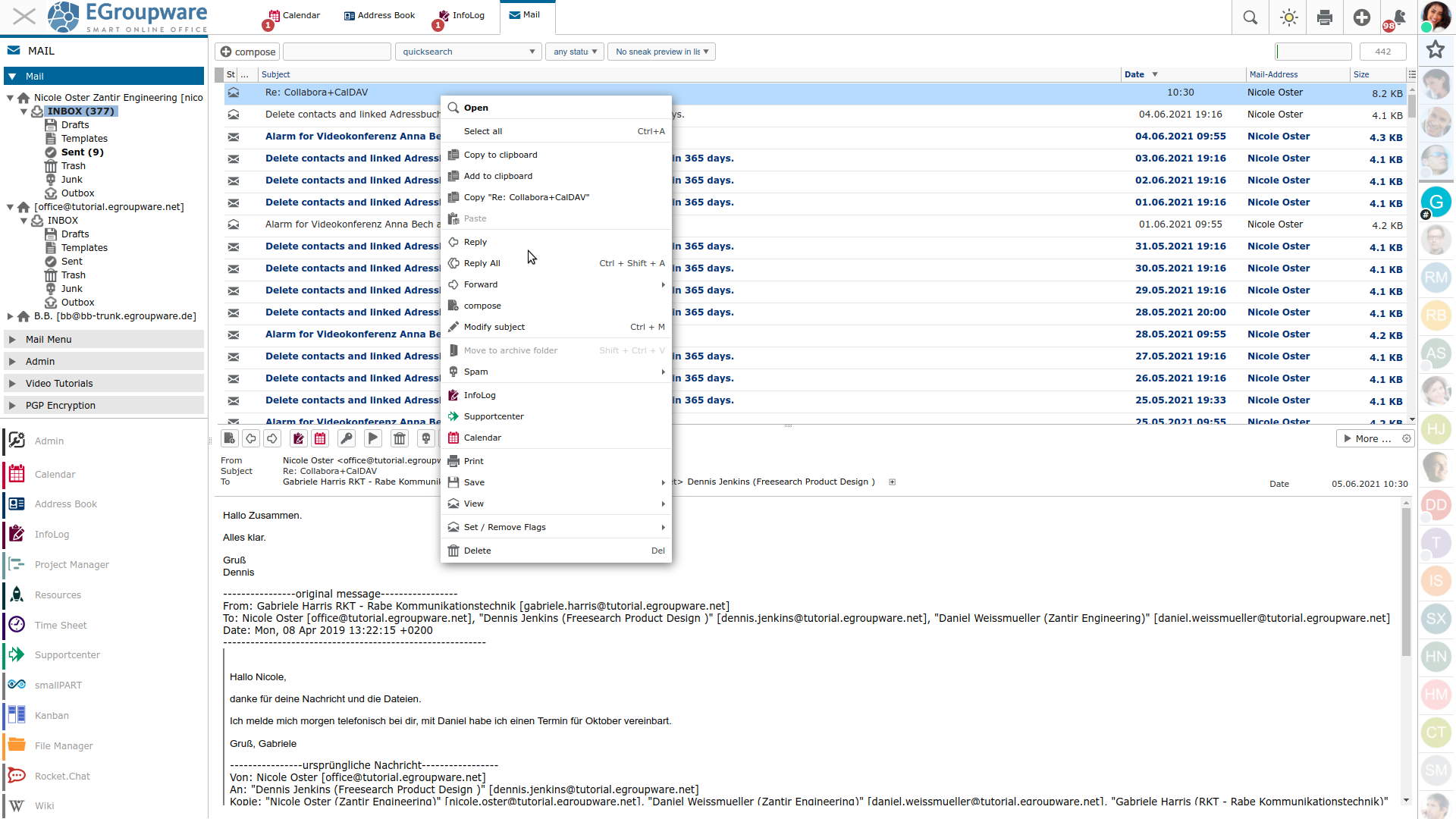
EGroupware E-mail client in the desktop web browser with context menu

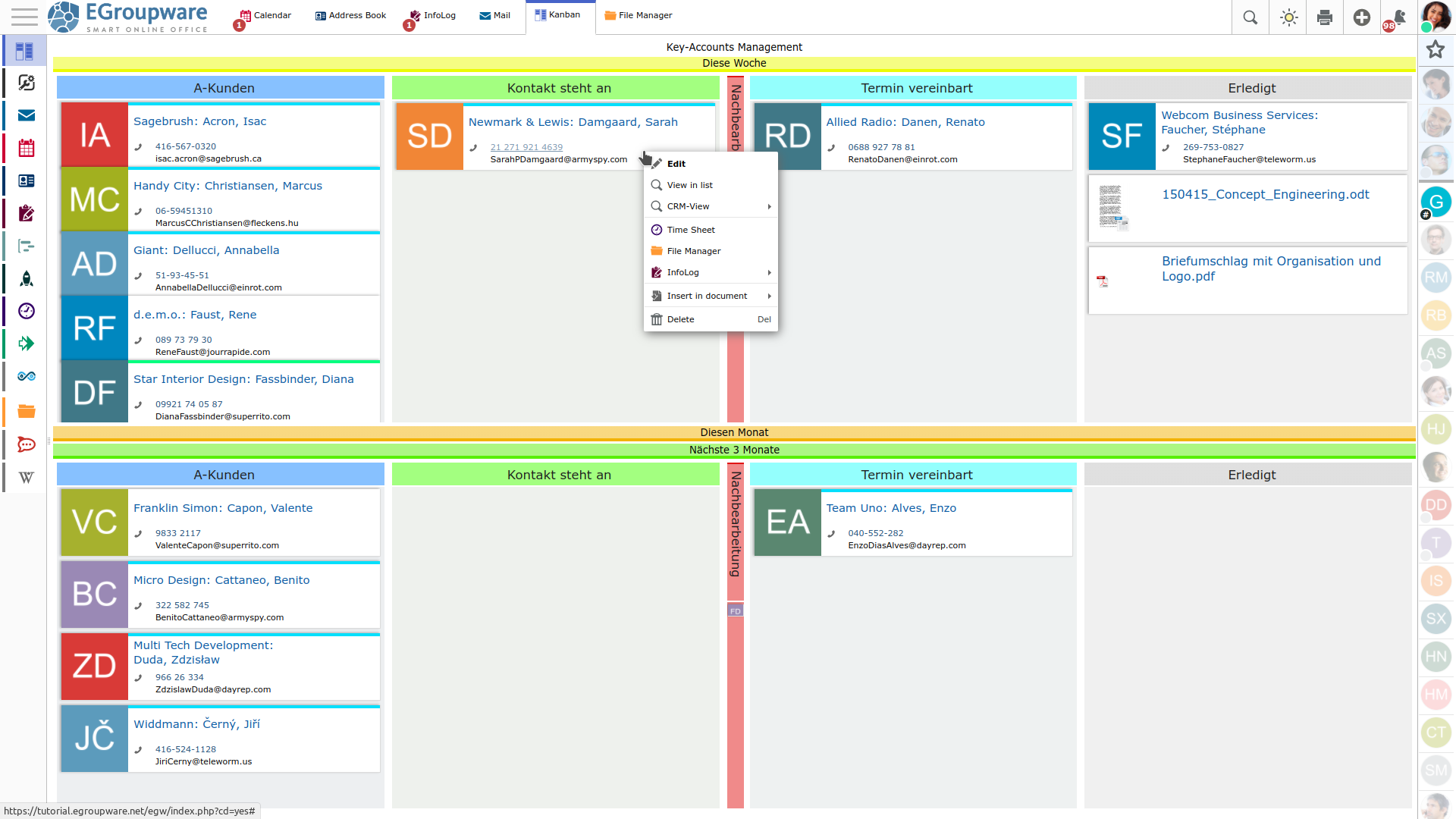
EGroupware Kanban in the desktop web browser with context menu

EGroupware File Manager (list view) in the desktop web browser with context menu

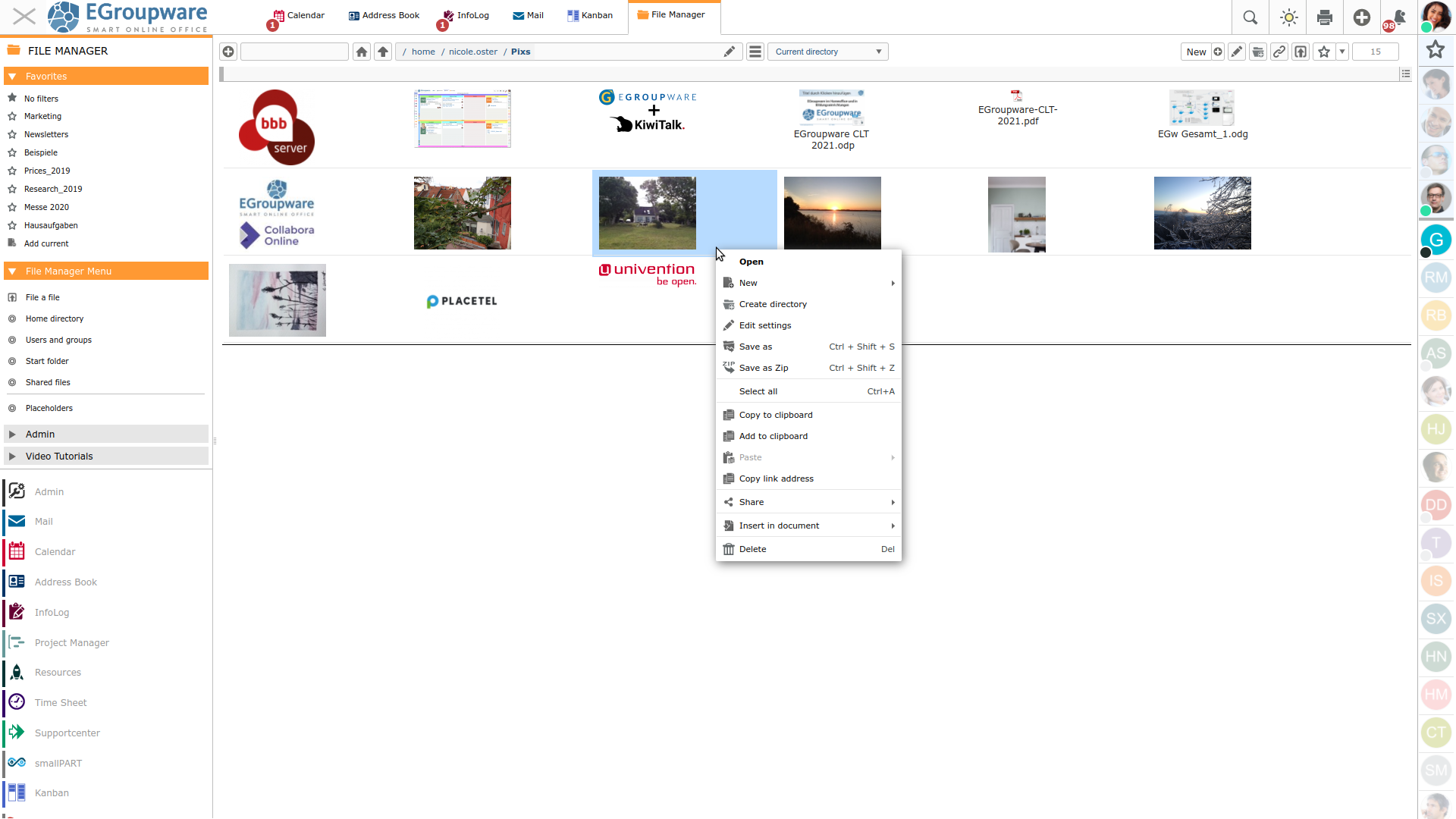
EGroupware File Manager (tile view) in the desktop web browser with context menu

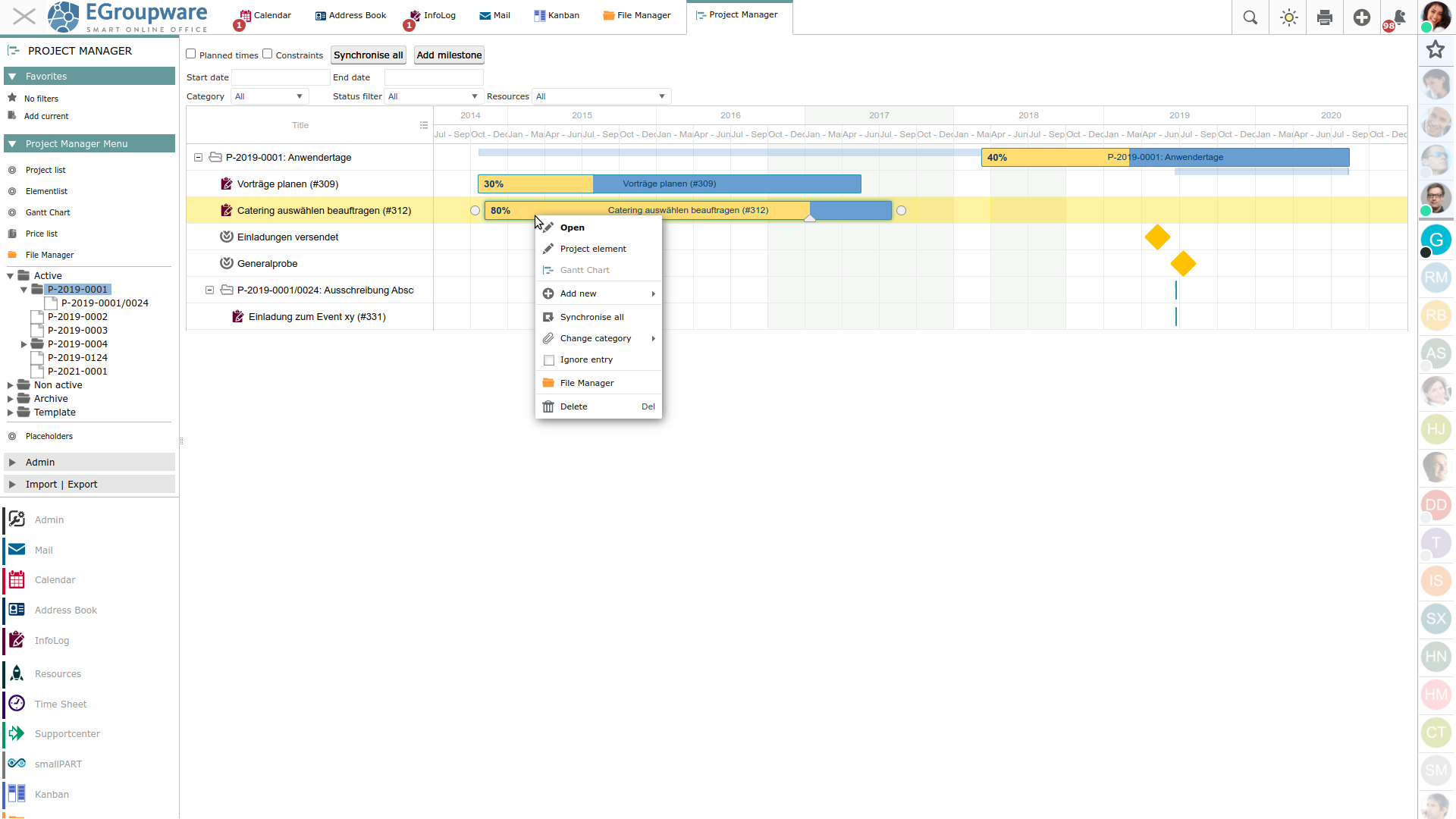
EGroupware Project Manager (Gantt view) in the desktop web browser with context menu

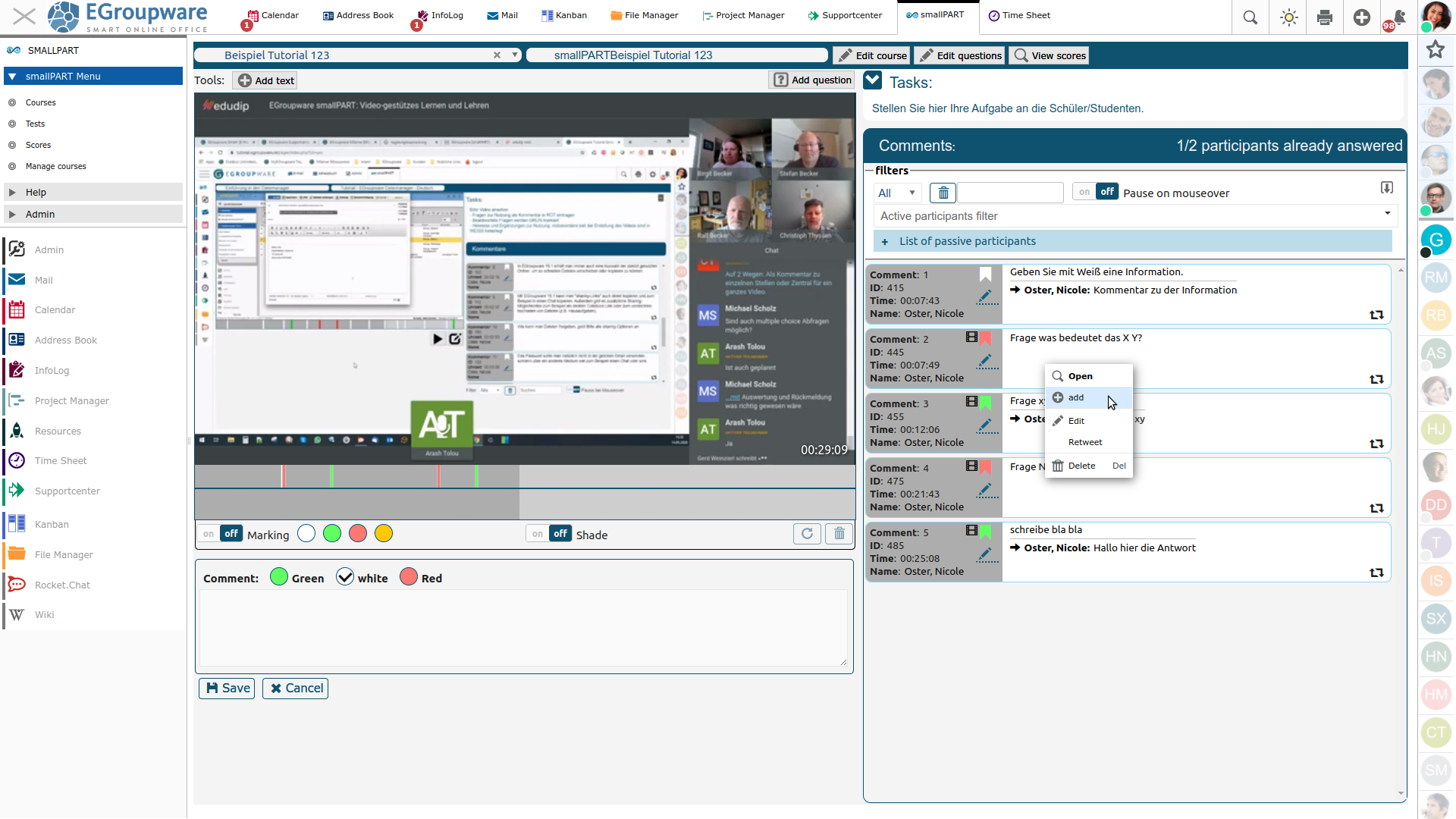
EGroupware smallPART in the desktop web browser with context menu

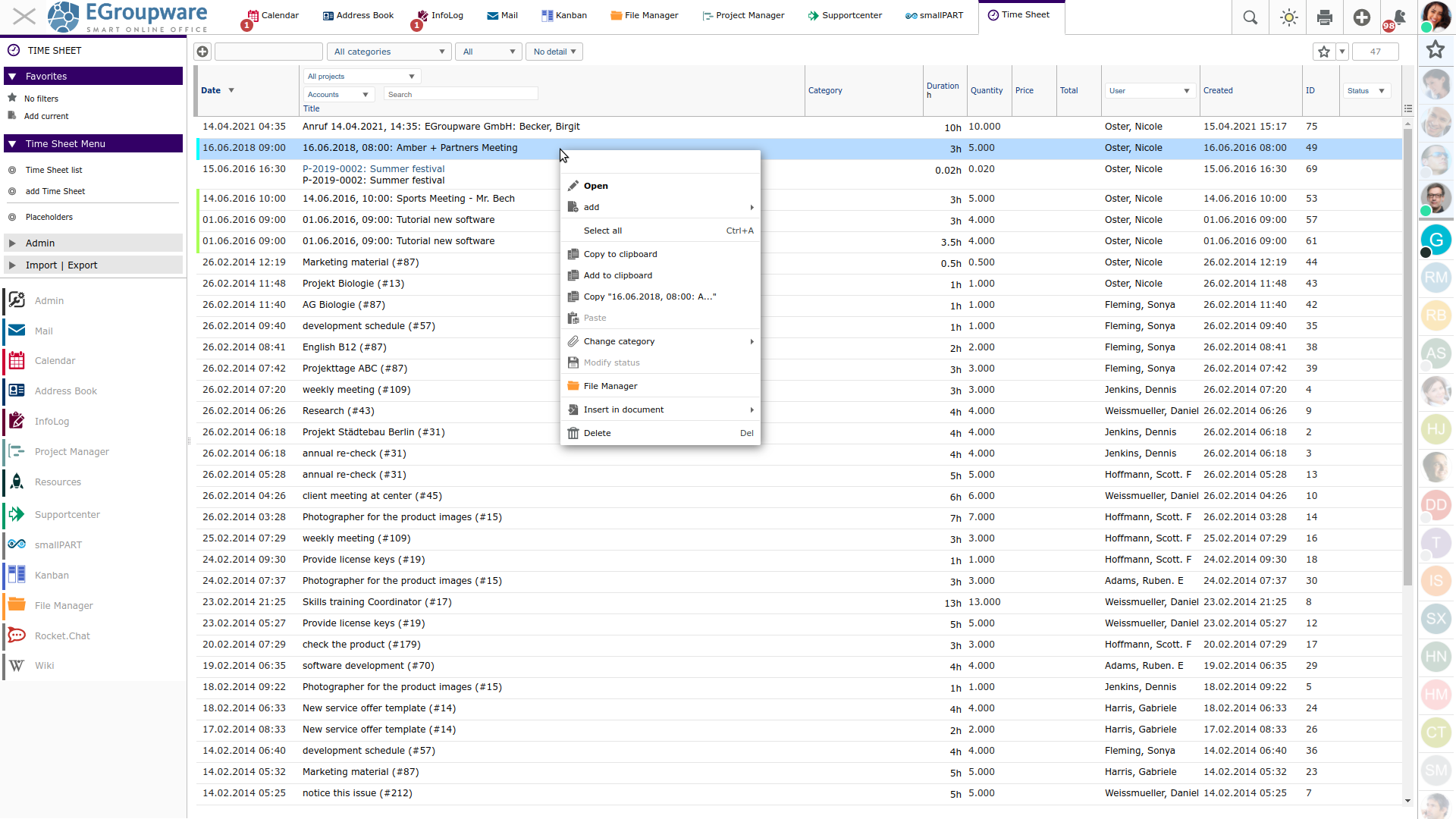
EGroupware Timesheet in the desktop web browser with context menu

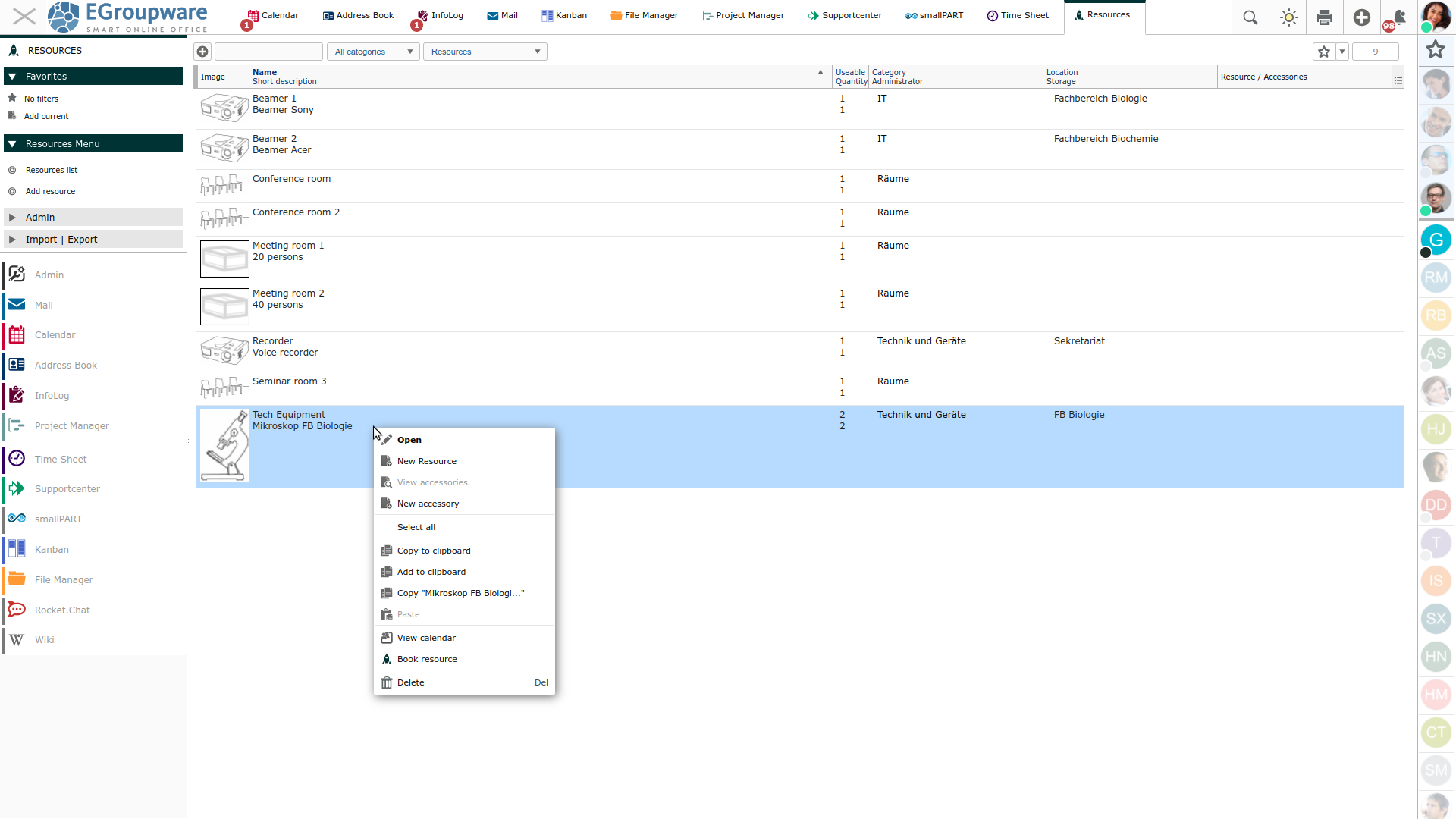
EGroupware Ressources in the desktop web browser with context menu

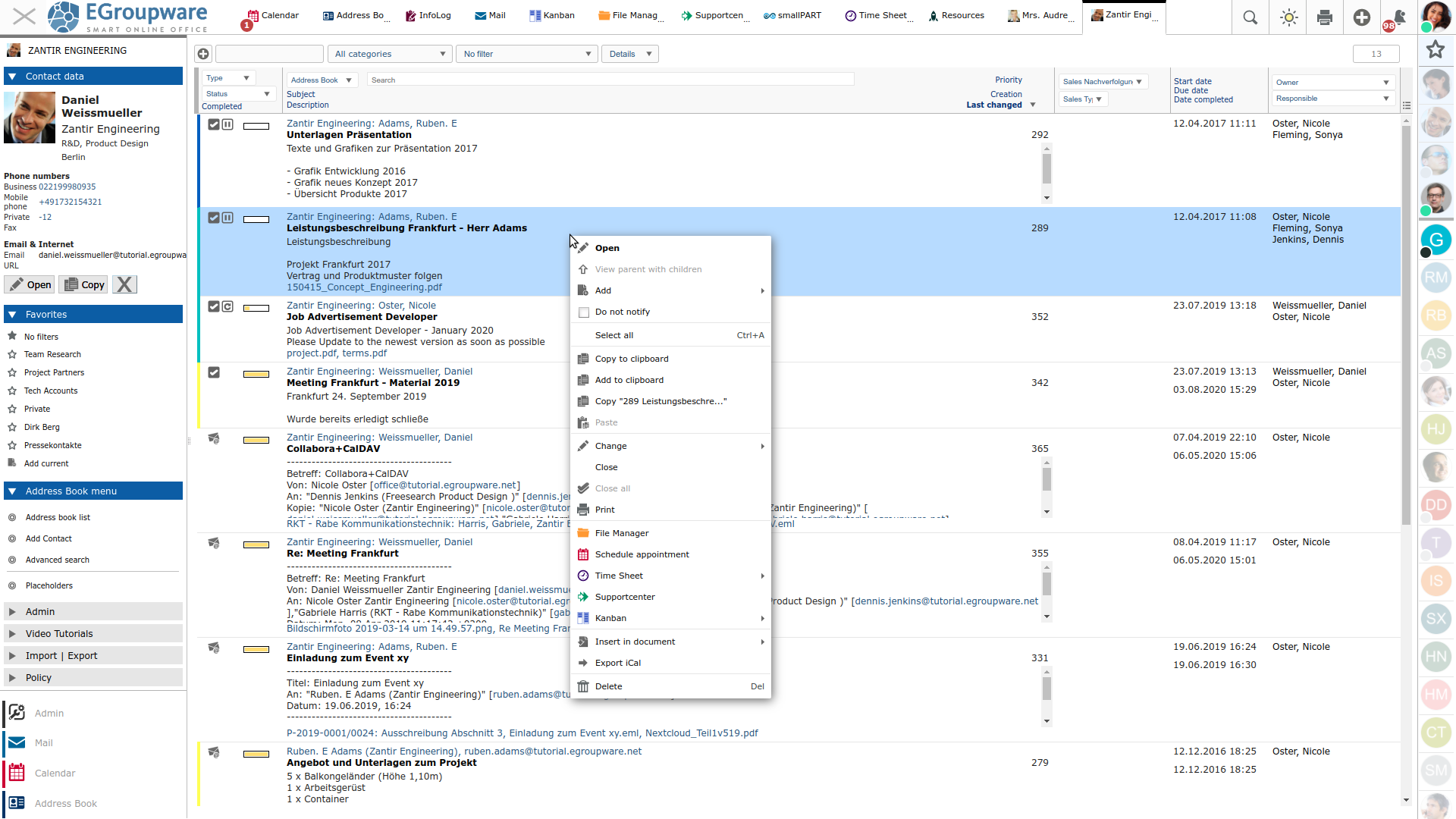
EGroupware CRM view (tasks) in the desktop web browser with context menu

== Literature ==
- Ralf Becker, Birgit Becker, Michaela Knotte, Ingo Kreißelmeyer: Manual EGroupware 1.4, English, Outdoor Unlimited Training GmbH, 1.Edition, January 2008, ISBN 978-3-9811968-1-8
- Ralf Becker, Birgit Becker, M. Knotte, I. Kreißelmeyer: Benutzerhandbuch EGroupware 1.4, German, Outdoor Unlimited Training GmbH, 1. Edition, August 2007, ISBN 978-3-9811968-0-1
