= Apache Celix =

- Developer(s): Apache Software Foundation
- Initial release: November 2010; 14 years ago
- Stable release: 2.4.0 / September 29, 2023; 17 months ago
- Repository: Celix Repository
- Written in: C, C++
- Operating system: Linux, macOS
- License: Apache License 2.0
- Website: https://celix.apache.org/

Apache Celix is an open-source implementation of the OSGi specification adapted to C and C++ developed by the Apache Software Foundation. The project aims to provide a framework to develop (dynamic) modular software applications using component and/or service-oriented programming.

Apache Celix is primarily developed in C and adds an additional abstraction, in the form of a library, to support for C++.

Modularity in Apache Celix is achieved by supporting - run-time installed - bundles. Bundles are zip files and can contain software modules in the form of shared libraries. Modules can provide and request dynamic services, for and from other modules, by interacting with a provided bundle context. Services in Apache Celix are "plain old" structs with function pointers or "plain old C++ Objects" (POCO).

== History ==
Apache Celix was welcomed in the Apache Incubator at November 2010 and graduated to Top Level Project from the Apache Incubator in July 2014.
