= Apache Directory =

Open-source directory server

Apache Directory Server
- Developer(s): Apache Software Foundation
- Stable release: 2.0.0-AM27 / October 23, 2023; 16 months ago
- Repository: Directory Server Repository
- Written in: Java
- Operating system: Cross-platform
- Type: LDAP
- License: Apache License 2.0
- Website: directory.apache.org

Apache Directory is an open source project of the Apache Software Foundation. The Apache Directory Server, originally written by Alex Karasulu, is an embeddable directory server entirely written in Java. It was certified LDAPv3-compatible by The Open Group in 2006. Besides LDAP, the server supports other protocols as well.

There exist these subprojects:

- Apache Directory Studio - an LDAP browser/editor for data, schema, LDIF, and DSML written in an Eclipse-based framework.
- Apache SCIMple - an implementation of SCIM v2.0 specification.
- Apache Fortress - a standards-based authorization system.
- Apache Kerby - a Kerberos implementation written in Java.
- Apache LDAP API - an SDK for directory access in Java.
- Apache Mavibot - a Multi Version Concurrency Control (MVCC) BTree in Java.

== See also ==
- List of LDAP software
