= Apache Roller =

Open-source blog server

- Developer: Apache Software Foundation
- Stable release: 6.1.2 / 2023-07-30[±]
- Repository: Roller Repository
- Written in: Java
- Operating system: Cross-platform
- Type: Weblog server
- License: Apache License 2.0
- Website: roller.apache.org

Apache Roller is a Java-based open-source "full-featured, Multi-blog, Multi-user, and group-blog server suitable for blog sites large and small". Roller was originally written by Dave Johnson in 2002 for a magazine article on open source development tools, but became popular at FreeRoller.net (now JRoller.com) and was later chosen to drive the employee blogs at Sun Microsystems, Inc. and IBM developerWorks blogs.

On April 23, 2007, Roller project graduated from incubator, so it became an official project of the Apache Software Foundation and it was released 3.1 version, first official release.
