= Apache Fortress =

Open source project of the Apache Software Foundation

- Developer(s): Apache Software Foundation
- Stable release: 3.0.1 / July 28, 2025; 2 days ago
- Repository: Fortress Repository
- Written in: Java
- Operating system: Cross-platform
- Type: Authorization
- License: Apache License 2.0
- Website: Official website

Apache Fortress is an open source project of the Apache Software Foundation and a subproject of the Apache Directory. It is an authorization system, written in Java, that provides role-based access control, delegated administration and password policy using an LDAP backend.

Standards implemented:

- Role-Based Access Control (RBAC) ANSI INCITS 359
- Administrative Role-Based Access Control (ARBAC02)
- IETF Password Policy (draft)
- Unix Users and Groups (RFC2307)

Fortress has four separate components:

- Core - A set of security authorization APIs.
- Realm - A Web Container plug-in that provides security for the Apache Tomcat container.
- Rest - HTTP protocol wrappers of core APIs using Apache CXF.
- Web - HTML pages of core APIs using Apache Wicket.

== History ==
Fortress was first contributed in 2011 to the OpenLDAP Foundation and moved to the Apache Directory project in 2014.

== API ==
Fortress provides security functions via APIs corresponding to the standards implemented. For example, its RBAC API design mimics the functional specifications of ANSI INCITS 359 with function names, entities being the same.
