= Dirk-Willem van Gulik =

European computer specialist (born 1968)

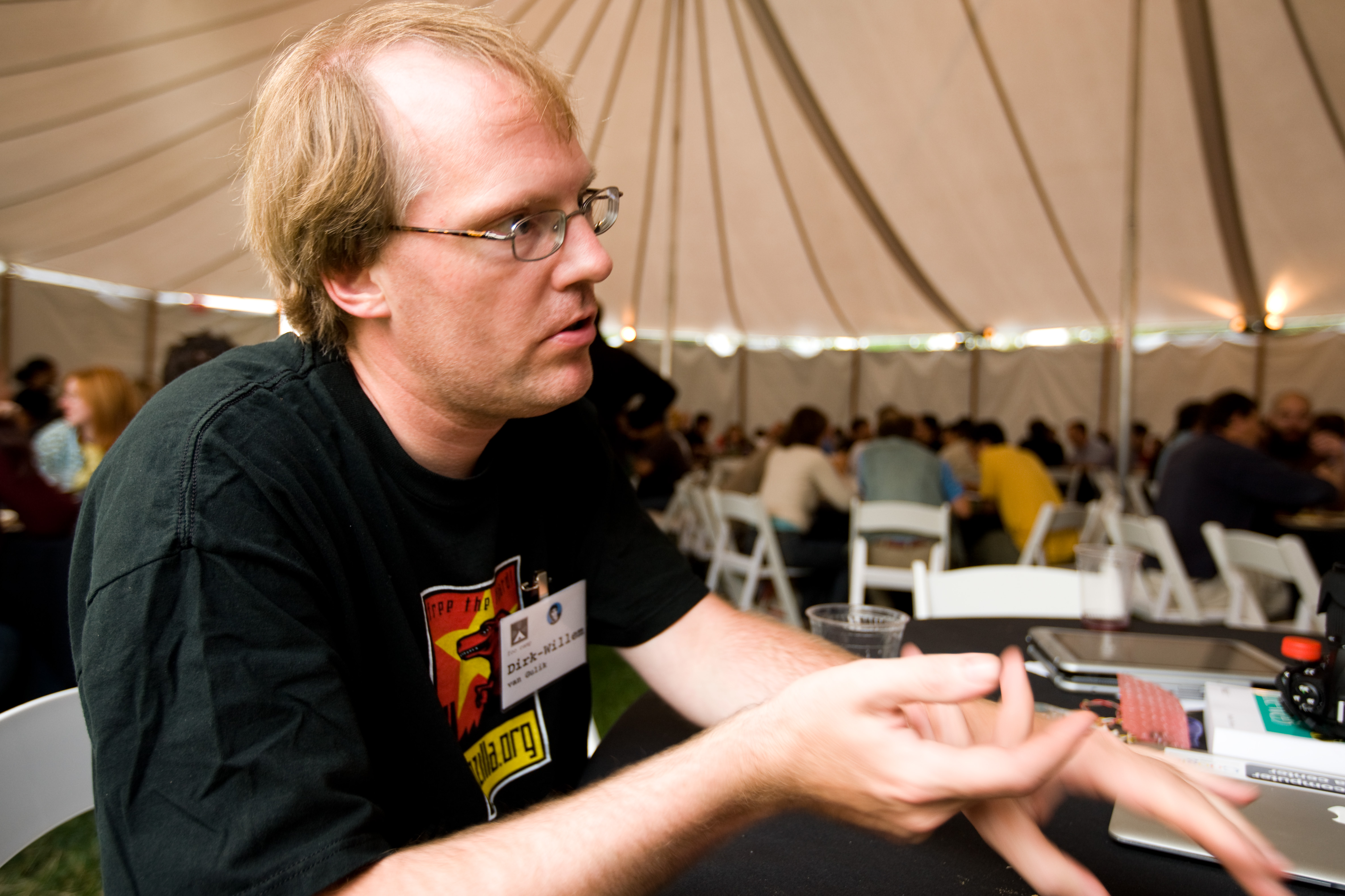
Dirk-Willem van Gulik

Dirk-Willem van Gulik (born February 1968) is a founder of the Apache Software Foundation and contributor to the Apache Webserver project. Van Gulik is the former CTO of Joost, where he was terminated, and current Chief Technical Architect of British Broadcasting Corporation's Future Media and Technology. He has also worked for the United Nations and European Commission. Van Gulik is based in the Netherlands.
