= Apache DataFusion =

Open-source analytical query engine

- Developer: Apache Software Foundation
- Written in: Rust
- Type: Query engine
- License: Apache License
- Website: datafusion.apache.org
- Repository: github.com/apache/datafusion

Apache DataFusion is an open-source, extensible analytical query engine written in Rust, built on Apache Arrow's columnar memory format. It provides SQL and DataFrame interfaces for analytical query execution and is designed to be used as a library by developers building databases, query engines, and analytical tools, rather than as a standalone database server. The project originated in 2017, was donated to the Apache Arrow project in 2019, and became a top-level project of the Apache Software Foundation in 2024. As of March 2026, DataFusion exceeded one million monthly downloads on crates.io.

== History ==
DataFusion originally authored by Andy Grove starting in 2017. It was donated to the Apache Arrow Project in February 2019. In 2024, a paper describing DataFusion was accepted to the industry track of the ACM SIGMOD conference. In April 2024, the project graduated from Apache Arrow and became a top-level Apache project.

== Features ==
DataFusion is a fast, extensible query engine for building data systems. It provides a SQL interface and a DataFrame API for constructing queries programmatically, a query planner and rule-based optimizer, and a multithreaded vectorized execution engine that processes data in columnar batches rather than row by row.

The engine reads common analytical file formats natively, including Apache Parquet, CSV, JSON, Avro, and Arrow IPC, and uses Apache Arrow's columnar memory format throughout execution, avoiding serialization overhead between stages.

DataFusion is designed for in-process embedding: it runs within the host application's process rather than as a separate server, using threads for parallel query execution. Its extension points allow downstream systems to add user-defined functions, custom data sources, custom query languages, and new optimizer rules, enabling developers to build specialized database systems on top of DataFusion's planning and execution components without reimplementing them.

DataFusion itself is written in Rust. The project also has official Python bindings and community-maintained bindings and tooling for other languages and runtimes.

== Adoption ==
DataFusion has been adopted across a range of analytics and database products. Cloudflare used DataFusion in its Log Explorer product to execute SQL queries over log data stored in Cloudflare R2. Palantir Lightweight Pipelines are powered by DataFusion. InfluxDB 3.0 uses DataFusion as part of the FDAP stack: Apache Flight, DataFusion, Arrow, and Parquet. Other users described in public sources include EDB Postgres AI, Cube, Spice AI, Pydantic Logfire, and Kamu.

Several projects in the broader Apache ecosystem and the community-maintained datafusion-contrib organization extend DataFusion's capabilities.

== Reception ==
In 2024, CRN included Apache DataFusion in its list of "The 10 Coolest Open-Source Software Tools Of 2024".

DataFusion is frequently compared with other columnar analytical systems including DuckDB, Polars, and Velox, but these systems differ significantly in scope and intended use.
