= Tine 2.0 =

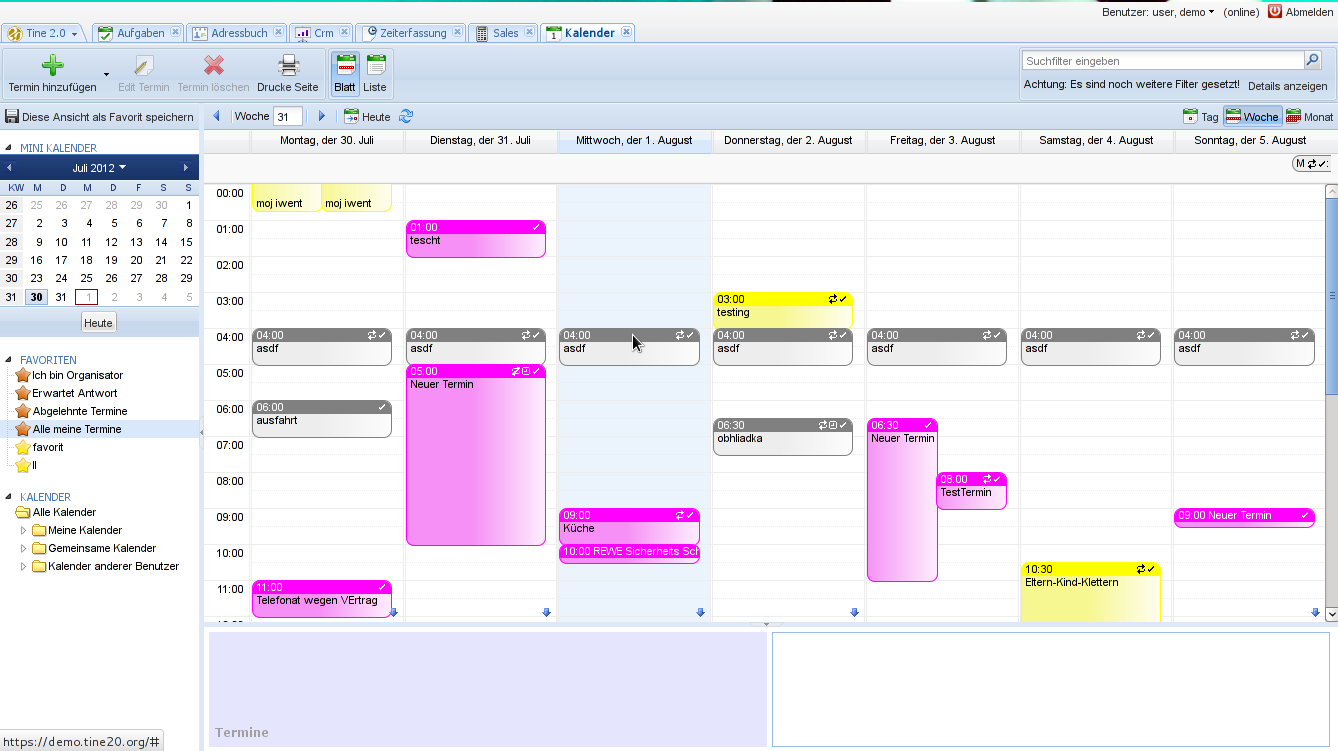
- Tine 2.0
- Developer: Open Source Project
- Stable release: 2017.11 / 23 November 2017; 8 years ago
- Written in: PHP, JavaScript
- Operating system: Cross-platform
- Available in: Various
- Type: Groupware
- License: GNU Affero General Public License
- Website: www.tine20.org
- Repository: github.com/tine20/tine20

Tine 2.0 is an open-source business software package covering the software categories groupware and Customer Relationship Management (CRM), released under the terms of the agpl license.

Tine 2.0 is platform independent and implemented as a service-oriented architecture (SOA) consisting of two major parts:

- The server component, acting as the master data source is written in PHP, and uses a SQL database as the central data storage.
- The client component, acting as the graphical user interface (GUI) is written in JavaScript and runs in the user's web browser.

Tine 2.0 wraps a set of API's around the software libraries ExtJS and Zend Framework to model an open architecture Rapid Application Development.

== History ==
Development of Tine 2.0 emerged from development of Egroupware, stemming from a discussion started in March 2007. Some developers of Egroupware wished to improve the quality of code and the technology upon which Egroupware is based. The discussion was held under the topic eGroupWare 2.0. In July 2007, the first design studies were released. At this time, the primary goal of development was the creation a new user interface for Egroupware. In November 2007, the concepts for eGroupWare 2.0 got more detailed. The main idea was still to provide way how to improve the existing code base of Egroupware. Unfortunately, not every developer agreed with the new ideas. The main concern was backward compatibility. In the end, some developers requested that this development should not be named eGroupWare 2.0 anymore. This led to the name Tine 2.0. The name of the project is based on the first letters of This is not eGroupWare 2.0.

After the renaming, Tine 2.0 migrated its source code to the eGroupWare svn repository. At this time, the main goal was to try out new technologies for the upcoming eGroupWare releases. As there was no demand in the eGroupWare project to try out new technologies, the Tine 2.0 project split from the eGroupWare project.

In 2008, Tine 2.0 was finalist of the SourceForge.net Community Choice Awards 2008 in the category best new project. More than 150,000 people voted for different open-source projects in different categories.

In 2009, Tine 2.0 was a finalist in Les Trophées du Libre in the professional category.

== Main features ==
- Calendar
- IMAP webmail client
- Addressbook
- CRM
- Task management
- Time tracker
- Synchronisation with mobile devices
- VoIP integration (click to dial)
- Provisioning of Snom VoiP telephones
- Course management for schools
- Filemanager
- CardDAV and CalDAV support
- HumanResources
- Inventory
- LDAP and ActiveDirectory support

== See also ==
- List of collaborative software § Open source or free software compares its features with others
