= Apache Airavata =

- Developer(s): Apache Software Foundation
- Stable release: 0.17 / March 21, 2019; 5 years ago
- Repository: Airavata Repository
- Written in: Java, C++
- License: Apache License 2.0
- Website: airavata.apache.org

Airavata is an open source software suite that composes, manages, executes, and monitors large-scale applications and workflows on computational resources, ranging from local clusters to national grids, and computing clouds.

== Components ==
Airavata consists of four components:

1. A workflow suite, allowing a user to compose and monitor workflows. These can be run on an Apache environment or exported to other workflow programming languages such as BPEL and Java.
2. An application wrapper service to convert command line programs into services that can be used reliably on a network.
3. A registry service that records how workflows and wrapped programs have been deployed.
4. A message broking service to enable communication over possibly unreliable networks to clients behind organizations' firewalls.
