= Lars Eilebrecht =

German software engineer (born 1972)

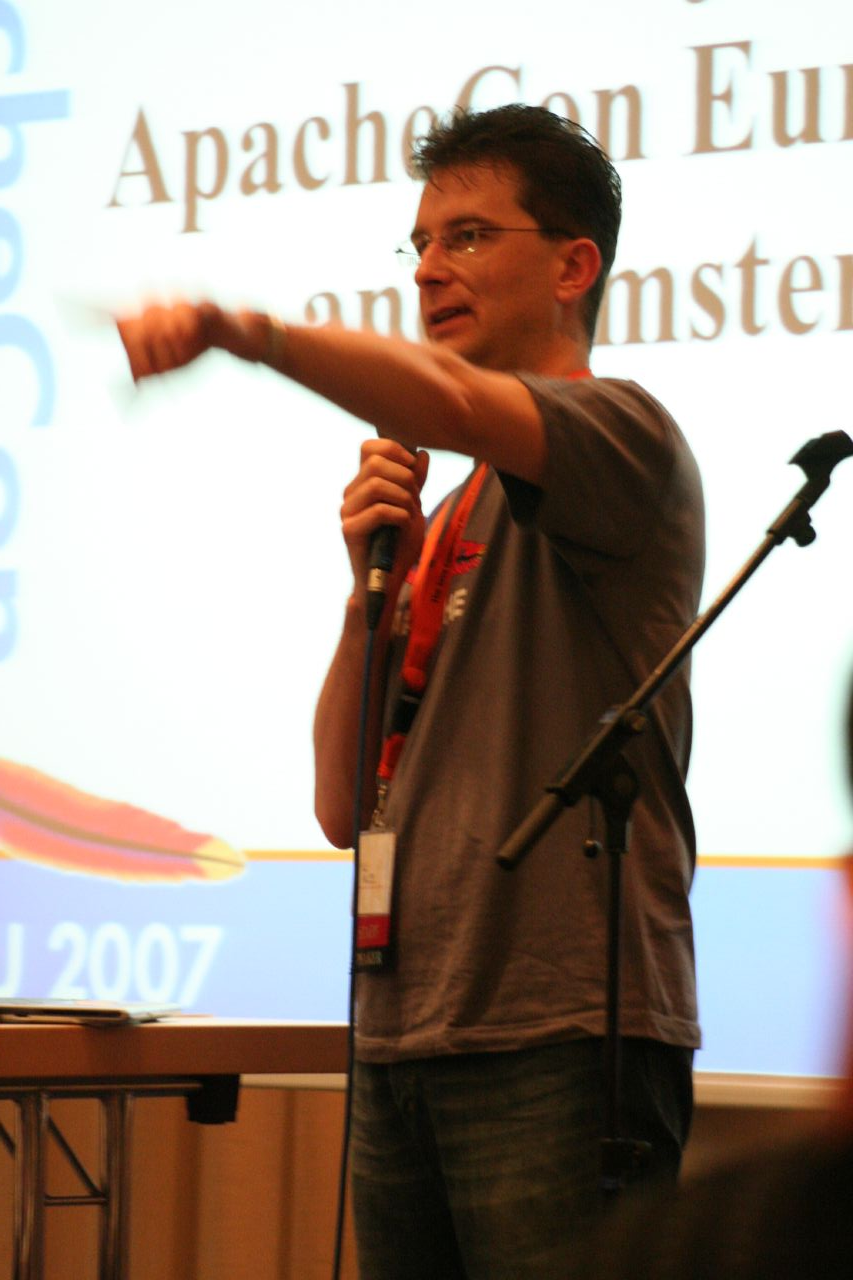
- Lars Eilebrecht speaking at ApacheCon Europe 2007 in Amsterdam
- Born: March 1972 (age 54)
- Education: University of Siegen
- Occupation: software engineer
- Known for: Apache HTTP Server
- Website: www.eilebrecht.net

Lars Eilebrecht (born March 1972) is a German software engineer, CISSP-certified information security expert, solutions architect, and open source evangelist. He is one of the original developers of the Apache HTTP Server, and co-founder and former Vice President of the Apache Software Foundation. Lars was based in the United Kingdom between 2009 and 2019 where he founded the IT consultancy company Primevation Ltd. Since 2019 he is based in Germany where he works as a Chief Information Security Officer.

== Open source ==
Lars has been active in open software projects, and most notably the Apache HTTP Server project. He was a member of the Apache Group, and is co-founder and member of the Apache Software Foundation.

Since the beginning of the Apache Software Foundation he was a member of the Conferences Committee helping the foundation to organise ApacheCon events. He served as Vice President, Conference Planning from 2007 to 2009. Additionally he is a member of the ASF Security Team and the ASF Public Relations Committee.

Lars is an open source evangelist and received O'Reilly's Appaloosa Award for raising awareness of Apache.

== Career ==
Between 2008 and 2019 Lars worked as an independent IT consultant for companies such as the BBC, Channel 4, Heise Media, El Tiempo and Pearson. Lars was owner and managing director of Primevation Ltd, and partner at pliXos GmbH. Previous employers of Lars Eilebrecht include Ciphire Labs, Quam, Parc Technologies, CyberSolutions, and Cable & Wireless.

Lars has an interest in IT security and cryptography. He has worked as a CISO for the Widas Group and polypoly, was Director Security Solutions and Chief Security Architect at Ciphire Labs, and speaker at conferences such as Financial Cryptography and Data Security and the 21st Chaos Communication Congress (21C3). Lars was a member of the International Financial Cryptography Association from 2005 to 2006.

In 1998 Lars received a Master of Science degree in Computer Engineering from the University of Siegen in Germany.

== Publications ==
Lars is the author of Apache Webserver, the first German-language book about the Apache HTTP Server. He published 5 editions of the book between 1997 and 2003.

== See also ==
- Apache Software Foundation
