= Fork and pull model =

Software development model

Fork and pull model refers to a software development model mostly used on GitHub, where multiple developers working on an open, shared project make their own contributions by sharing a main repository and pushing changes after granted pull request by integrator users. Followed by the advent of distributed version control systems (DVCS), Git naturally enables the usage of a pull-based development model, in which developers can copy the project onto their own repository and then push their changes to the original repository, where the integrators will determine the validity of the pull request. Since its appearance, pull-based development has gained popularity within the open software development community. On GitHub, over 400,000 pull-requests emerged per month on average in 2015. It is also the model shared on most collaborative coding platforms, like Bitbucket, Gitorious, etc. More and more functionalities are added to facilitate pull-based model.
