= Apache Apex =

YARN-native platform

- Developer: Apache Software Foundation
- Final release: 3.7.0 / April 27, 2018; 8 years ago
- Written in: Java and Scala
- Operating system: Cross-platform
- Type: Stream processing, Batch processing
- License: Apache License 2.0
- Website: apex.apache.org
- Repository: Apex Repository

Apache Apex is a YARN-native platform that unifies stream and batch processing. It processes big data-in-motion in a way that is scalable, performant, fault-tolerant, stateful, secure, distributed, and easily operable.

Apache Apex was named a top-level project by The Apache Software Foundation on April 25, 2016. As of September 2019, it is no longer actively developed.

== Overview ==
Apache Apex is developed under the Apache License 2.0. The project was driven by the San Jose, California-based start-up company DataTorrent.

There are two parts of Apache Apex: Apex Core and Apex Malhar. Apex Core is the platform or framework for building distributed applications on Hadoop. The core Apex platform is supplemented by Malhar, a library of connector and logic functions, enabling rapid application development. These input and output operators provide templates to sources and sinks such as Alluxio, S3, HDFS, NFS, FTP, Kafka, ActiveMQ, RabbitMQ, JMS, Cassandra, MongoDB, Redis, HBase, CouchDB, generic JDBC, and other database connectors.

== History ==
DataTorrent has developed the platform since 2012 and then decided to open source the core that became Apache Apex. It entered incubation in August 2015 and became Apache Software Foundation top level project within 8 months. DataTorrent itself shut down in May 2018.

As of September 2019, Apache Apex is no longer being developed.

Module	Version	Release date
Apex Core	3.7.0	27 April 2018
Apex Malhar	3.8.0	11 November 2017
Apex Core	3.6.0	5 May 2017
Apex Malhar	3.7.0	31 March 2017
Apex Core	3.5.0	12 December 2016
Apex Malhar	3.6.0	9 December 2016
Apex Malhar	3.5.0	3 September 2016
Apex Core and Malhar	3.4.0	5 May 2016

== Apex Big Data World ==
Apex Big Data World is a conference about Apache Apex. The first conference of Apex Big Data World took place in 2017. They were held in Pune, India and Mountain View, California, USA.
