= OpenCMIS =

Open-source project

OpenCMIS is a subproject of the Apache Chemistry project of the Apache Software Foundation (ASF).

It is an open-source collection of Java libraries, frameworks and tools around the CMIS specification for document interoperability.

The goal of OpenCMIS is to make CMIS simple for client and server Java developers. It hides the binding details and provides APIs and SPIs on different abstraction levels. It also includes test tools for content repository developers and client application developers.

The OpenCMIS products are:

- A server-side Java library
- A client-side Java library
- A client-side Android library
- CMIS Workbench: a CMIS heavy client, that allows all CMIS operations, and allows to run the TCK unit tests
- OpenCMIS Server Webapps: a CMIS server and web user interface
- OpenCMIS JCR Repository: A wrapper to use JCR repositories via CMIS
- OpenCMIS Bridge
