= The Apache Software Foundation =

Nonprofit open-source software corporation

- Formation: 1999
- Type: 501(c)(3) organization
- Purpose: Open-source software
- Headquarters: 1000 N West Street, Suite 1200, Wilmington, Delaware 19801, United States
- Method: Apache License
- Revenue: ▲$2.31 million (2023)
- Expenses: ▲$2.01 million (2023)
- Website: apache.org

The Apache Software Foundation (/əˈpætʃi/ ə-PATCH-ee; ASF) is an American nonprofit corporation (classified as a 501(c)(3) organization in the United States) that supports a number of open-source software projects. The ASF was formed from a group of developers of the Apache HTTP Server, and incorporated on March 25, 1999. As of 2021, it includes approximately 1000 members.

The Apache Software Foundation is a decentralized open source community of developers. The software they produce is distributed under the terms of the Apache License, a permissive open-source license for free and open-source software (FOSS). The Apache projects are characterized by a collaborative, consensus-based development process and an open and pragmatic software license, which is to say that it allows developers, who receive the software freely, to redistribute it under non-free terms. Each project is managed by a self-selected team of technical experts who are active contributors to the project. The ASF is a meritocracy, with membership granted only to volunteers who have actively contributed to Apache projects.

Among the ASF's objectives are: to provide legal protection to volunteers working on Apache projects, and to prevent the "Apache" brand name from being used by other organizations without permission.

The ASF holds several Community Over Code conferences each year, highlighting Apache projects and related technology.

== History ==
The history of the Apache Software Foundation is linked to the Apache HTTP Server. Beginning in February 1993, a group of eight developers—later known as the Apache Group—started working on enhancing the NCSA HTTPd daemon, and on March 25, 1999, they formed the Apache Software Foundation. Its first official meeting was held on April 13, 1999, and after a series of additional meetings to elect board members and resolve other legal matters regarding incorporation, the effective incorporation date of the Apache Software Foundation was set to June 1, 1999.

The initial "Apache Group" members of the Apache Software Foundation were: Brian Behlendorf, Ken Coar, Miguel Gonzales, Mark Cox, Lars Eilebrecht, Ralf S. Engelschall, Roy T. Fielding, Dean Gaudet, Ben Hyde, Jim Jagielski, Alexei Kosut, Martin Kraemer, Ben Laurie, Doug MacEachern, Aram Mirzadeh, Sameer Parekh, Cliff Skolnick, Marc Slemko, William (Bill) Stoddard, Paul Sutton, Randy Terbush and Dirk-Willem van Gulik.

Co-founder Brian Behlendorf described why the name 'Apache' was chosen:

"I suggested the name Apache partly because the web technologies at the time that were launching were being called cyber this or spider that or something on those themes and I was like we need something a little more interesting, a little more romantic, not to be a cultural appropriator or anything like that, I had just seen a documentary about Geronimo and the last days of a Native American tribe called the Apaches right, who succumbed to the invasion from the West, from the United States, and they were the last tribe to give up their territory and for me that almost romantically represented what I felt we were doing with this web-server project. . . "

== Projects ==
Apache divides its software development activities into separate semi-autonomous areas called "top-level projects" (formally known as a "Project Management Committee" in the bylaws), some of which have a number of sub-projects. Unlike some other organizations that host FOSS projects, before a project is hosted at Apache it has to be licensed to the ASF with a grant or contributor agreement. In this way, the ASF gains the necessary intellectual property rights for the development and distribution of all its projects.

== Board of directors ==
The board of directors of The Apache Software Foundation (ASF) is responsible for management and oversight of the business and affairs of the corporation in accordance with the Bylaws. This includes management of the corporate assets (funds, intellectual property, trademarks, and support equipment), appointment of a President and corporate officers managing the core operations of the ASF, and allocation of corporate resources for the benefit of Apache projects. Technical decision-making authority for every Apache project is assigned to their independent project management committee; the participants in each project provide direction, not the board. The board is elected annually by the ASF membership.

Since March 6, 2026, the board of directors has been:

- Zili Chen
- Shane Curcuru
- Christofer Dutz
- Emmanuel Lécharny
- Justin Mclean
- Jean-Baptiste Onofré
- Christopher Schultz
- Greg Stein
- Sander Striker

== See also ==
- List of Apache Software Foundation projects
- Apache Attic
- Apache Incubator
- Log4Shell
- CNCF
- Linux Foundation
