= List of Apache modules =

In computing, the Apache HTTP Server, an open-source HTTP server, comprises a small core for HTTP request/response processing and for Multi-Processing Modules (MPM) which dispatches data processing to threads or processes. Many additional modules (or "mods") are available to extend the core functionality for special purposes.

The following is a list of all the first- and third-party modules available for the most recent stable release of Apache web server:

Name	Compatibility	Status	Developer(s)	License	Description
mod_access_compat	Versions 2.3 and later	Included by Default	Apache Software Foundation	Apache License, Version 2.0	Provides compatibility with access control available in Apache httpd v2.2 and earlier.
mod_access_dnsbl	Versions 2.0 and later	Third party module	Pete Houston	Apache License, Version 2.0	Allows access control via DNSBLs.
mod_actions	Versions 1.1 and later	Included by Default	Apache Software Foundation	Apache License, Version 2.0	Provides CGI ability based on request method and media type
mod_alias	Versions 1.1 and later	Included by Default	Apache Software Foundation	Apache License, Version 2.0	Allows for client requests to be mapped to different parts of a server's file system and for the requests to be redirected entirely
mod_allowmethods	Versions 2.3 and later	Included by Default	Apache Software Foundation	Apache License, Version 2.0	Easily restrict what HTTP methods can be used on the server.
mod_asis	Versions 1.3 and later	Included by Default	Apache Software Foundation	Apache License, Version 2.0	Allows for the use of files that contain their own HTTP headers
mod_auth_basic	Versions 2.1 and newer	Included by Default	Apache Software Foundation	Apache License, Version 2.0	Authenticates users via HTTP Basic Authentication, the backend mechanism for verifying user authentication is left to configurable providers, usually other Apache modules. This module replaces the authentication frontend of several older modules.
mod_auth_digest	Versions 1.3.8 and newer	Stable Extension	Apache Software Foundation	Apache License, Version 2.0	Authenticates users via HTTP Digest Authentication utilizing MD5 encryption. This is more secure than HTTP Basic Authentication provided by other modules. As of Apache 2.1, this module acts as a front-end to authentication providers who verify the actual login.
mod_auth_form	Versions 2.3 and newer	Included by Default	Apache Software Foundation	Apache License, Version 2.0	Authenticates users via a login form on a webpage, the backend mechanism for verifying user authentication is left to configurable providers, usually other Apache modules. This module was created to provide functionality similar to that provided by Apache Tomcat.
mod_auth_gssapi	Version 2.2 and newer	Third-party extension	Masarykova Universita	MIT License	Using the Basic Auth mechanism, it retrieves a username/password pair from the browser and checks them against a Kerberos server. Replaced mod_auth_kerb.
mod_authn_anon	Version 2.1 and newer	Stable Extension	Apache Software Foundation	Apache License, Version 2.0	Acts as an authentication provider to other modules, like mod_auth_basic and mod_auth_digest, users are authenticated by using a special user id of "anonymous" and providing their email as the password.
mod_authn_core	Versions 2.3 and newer	Included by Default	Apache Software Foundation	Apache License, Version 2.0	This module provides core authentication capabilities to allow or deny access to portions of the web site.
mod_authn_dbd	Version 2.1 and newer	Stable Extension	Apache Software Foundation	Apache License, Version 2.0	This module provides authentication front-ends such as mod_auth_digest, mod_auth_basic, and mod_auth_form to authenticate users by looking up users in SQL tables. Similar functionality is provided by, for example, mod_authn_file.
mod_authn_dbm	Version 2.1 and newer	Stable Extension	Apache Software Foundation	Apache License, Version 2.0	This module provides authentication front-ends such as mod_auth_digest, mod_auth_basic, and mod_auth_form to authenticate users by looking up users in dbm password files. Similar functionality is provided by mod_authn_file.
mod_authn_file	Version 2.1 and newer	Included by Default	Apache Software Foundation	Apache License, Version 2.0	Acts as an authentication provider to other modules, like mod_auth_basic, mod_auth_digest, and mod_auth_form, by checking users against plaintext password files.
mod_authn_otp	Version 2.4 and newer	Third party module	Archie Cobbs	Apache License, Version 2.0	Acts as an authentication provider to other modules, like mod_auth_basic, mod_auth_digest, and mod_auth_form, by checking passwords that contain a variable portion based on the HOTP/OATH one-time password algorithm defined in RFC 4226.
mod_authn_socache	Versions 2.3 and newer	Included by Default	Apache Software Foundation	Apache License, Version 2.0	Maintains a cache of authentication credentials, so that a new backend lookup is not required for every authenticated request.
mod_authnz_external	Versions 1.3 and newer	Third-party module	Nathan Neulinger, Tyler Allison, Jan Wolter, Dave Woolaway, Sven Koch	Apache License, Version 1.0	Acts as an authentication provider to other modules, like mod_auth_basic, mod_auth_digest, and mod_auth_form, by checking users against an external command.
mod_authnz_fcgi	Versions 2.4 and newer	Included by Default	Apache Software Foundation	Apache License, Version 2.0	This module allows FastCGI authorizer applications to authenticate users and authorize access to resources.
mod_authnz_ldap	Version 2.1 and newer	Stable Extension	Apache Software Foundation	Apache License, Version 2.0	Acts as an authentication provider to other modules and checks authentication against an LDAP directory.
mod_authnz_sspi	Version 2.4	Third-party extension	Tim Costello	Apache License, Version 2.0	SSPI authentication module which let users authenticate against Win32 domains. Replaced mod_auth_sspi.
mod_authz_core	Versions 2.3 and newer	Included by Default	Apache Software Foundation	Apache License, Version 2.0	This module provides core authorization capabilities to allow or deny access to portions of the web site.
mod_authz_dbd	Version 2.4 and newer	Stable Extension	Apache Software Foundation	Apache License, Version 2.0	This module provides authorization capabilities by looking up users in SQL tables. Similar functionality is provided by, for example, mod_authz_groupfile.
mod_authz_dbm	Version 2.1 and newer	Stable Extension	Apache Software Foundation	Apache License, Version 2.0	This module provides authorization capabilities by looking up users in dbm password files. Similar functionality is provided by mod_authz_groupfile.
mod_authz_groupfile	Version 2.1 and newer	Included by Default	Apache Software Foundation	Apache License, Version 2.0	This module provides authorization capabilities by looking up users in a plaintext group file.
mod_authz_host	Version 2.1 and newer	Included by Default	Apache Software Foundation	Apache License, Version 2.0	Group authorizations based on host (name or IP address).
mod_authz_owner	Version 2.1 and newer	Included by Default	Apache Software Foundation	Apache License, Version 2.0	Authorization based on file ownership.
mod_authz_user	Version 2.1 and newer	Included by Default	Apache Software Foundation	Apache License, Version 2.0	Authorization of explicit users.
mod_authz_svn	Version 2.1 and newer	Third-party module	Apache Software Foundation	Apache License, Version 2.0	Apache configuration directives for configuring path-based authorization for Subversion repositories served through the Apache HTTP Server.
mod_autoindex	Version 1.3 and newer	Included by Default	Apache Software Foundation	Apache License, Version 2.0	Generates automatic directory listing for display by the server
mod_brotli	Version 2.4 and newer	Included by Default	Apache Software Foundation	Apache License, Version 2.0	Compress content via Brotli before it is delivered to the client.
mod_buffer	Version 2.4 and newer	Included by Default	Apache Software Foundation	Apache License, Version 2.0	Buffer the input and output filter stacks.
mod_cache	Version 2.0 and newer	Stable Extension	Apache Software Foundation	Apache License, Version 2.0	HTTP caching filter.
mod_cache_disk	Version 2.0 and newer	Stable Extension	Apache Software Foundation	Apache License, Version 2.0	Disk based storage manager for the HTTP caching filter.
mod_cache_socache	Version 2.4 and newer	Stable Extension	Apache Software Foundation	Apache License, Version 2.0	Shared object cache (socache) based storage manager for the HTTP caching filter.
mod_cern_meta	Version 1.1 and newer	Stable Extension	Apache Software Foundation	Apache License, Version 2.0	CERN httpd metafile semantics.
mod_cgi	Version 1.1 and newer	Included by Default	Apache Software Foundation	Apache License, Version 2.0	Execution of CGI scripts.
mod_cgid	Version 2.0 and newer, "Unix threaded MPMs only"	Included by Default	Apache Software Foundation	Apache License, Version 2.0	Execution of CGI scripts using an external CGI daemon.
mod_charset_lite	Version 2.0 and newer	Stable Extension	Apache Software Foundation	Apache License, Version 2.0	Specify character set translation or recoding.
mod_contact	Version 2.4 and newer	Third party module	Graham Leggett	Apache License, Version 2.0	Module that implements an email contact us form with file upload. Depends on mod_multipart.
mod_crowdsec	Version 2.4 and above	Third-party module	CrowdSec	MIT License	Allows filtering of unwanted web traffic.
mod_data	Version 2.3 and newer	Included by Default	Apache Software Foundation	Apache License, Version 2.0	Convert response body into an RFC 2397 data URL.
mod_dav	Version 2.0 and newer	Stable Extension	Apache Software Foundation	Apache License, Version 2.0	Provides WebDAV (Web-based Distributed Authoring and Versioning) functionality in Apache.
mod_dav_fs	Version 2.0 and newer	Stable Extension	Apache Software Foundation	Apache License, Version 2.0	Acts as a support module for mod_dav and provides access to resources located in the server's file system.
mod_dav_lock	Version 2.0 and newer	Stable Extension	Apache Software Foundation	Apache License, Version 2.0	Generic locking module for mod_dav.
mod_dav_svn	Version 2.1 and newer	Third-party module	Apache Software Foundation	Apache License, Version 2.0	Apache configuration directives for serving Apache Subversion repositories through the Apache HTTP Server.
mod_dbd	Version 2.1 and newer	Stable Extension	Apache Software Foundation	Apache License, Version 2.0	Manages SQL database connections.
mod_deflate	Version 2.0 and newer	Stable Extension	Apache Software Foundation	Apache License, Version 2.0	Compress content before it is delivered to the client.
mod_dialup	Version 1.3 and newer	Included by Default	Apache Software Foundation	Apache License, Version 2.0	Send static content at a bandwidth rate limit, defined by the various old modem standards.
mod_dir	Version 1.3 and newer	Included by Default	Apache Software Foundation	Apache License, Version 2.0	Provides for "trailing slash" redirects and serving directory index files.
mod_dumpio	Version 2.0 and newer	Stable Extension	Apache Software Foundation	Apache License, Version 2.0	Allows for the logging of all input received by Apache or all output sent by Apache to be logged (dumped) to the error.log file.
mod_echo	Version 2.0 and newer	Stable Extension	Apache Software Foundation	Apache License, Version 2.0	This module provides an example protocol module to illustrate the concept. It provides a simple echo server. Telnet to it and type stuff, and it will echo it.
mod_env	Version 1.1 and newer	Included by Default	Apache Software Foundation	Apache License, Version 2.0	This module allows for control of internal environment variables that are used by various Apache HTTP Server modules. These variables are also provided to CGI scripts as native system environment variables, and available for use in SSI pages. Environment variables may be passed from the shell which invoked the httpd process. Alternatively, environment variables may be set or unset within the configuration process.
mod_evasive	Version 1.3 and newer	Third-party module	Jonathan Zdziarski	GNU GPLv2	Evasive maneuvers module for Apache to provide evasive action in the event of an HTTP DoS or DDoS attack or brute force attack. Also designed to be a detection and network management tool.
mod_example_hooks	Version 1.2 and newer	Experimental Extension	Apache Software Foundation	Apache License, Version 2.0	Illustrates the Apache module API.
mod_expires	Version 1.2 and newer	Included by Default	Apache Software Foundation	Apache License, Version 2.0	Generation of Expires and Cache-Control HTTP headers according to user-specified criteria.
mod_ext_filter	Version 1.3 and newer	Stable Extension	Apache Software Foundation	Apache License, Version 2.0	Pass the response body through an external program before delivery to the client.
mod_file_cache	Version 2.0 and newer	Stable Extension	Apache Software Foundation	Apache License, Version 2.0	Caches a static list of files in memory.
mod_filter	Version 2.1 and newer	Included by Default	Apache Software Foundation	Apache License, Version 2.0	Context-sensitive smart filter configuration module.
mod_gnutls	Version 2.0 and newer	Third-party module	Paul Querna, Nikos Mavrogiannopoulos, Dash Shendy, Fiona Klute	Apache License, Version 2.0	SSL/TLS engine based on GnuTLS. Similar to mod_ssl in purpose, but it supports some features and protocols that mod_ssl does not, and it does not use OpenSSL.
mod_gosp	Version 2.4 and newer	Third-party module	Scott Pakin	BSD 3-Clause Clear License	Embed server-side Go code on web pages à la PHP.
mod_headers	Version 1.2 and newer	Stable Extension	Apache Software Foundation	Apache License, Version 2.0	Customization of HTTP request and response headers.
mod_heartbeat	Version 2.3 and newer	Included by Default	Apache Software Foundation	Apache License, Version 2.0	Sends messages with server status to frontend proxy.
mod_heartmonitor	Version 2.3 and newer	Included by Default	Apache Software Foundation	Apache License, Version 2.0	Centralized monitor for mod_heartbeat origin servers.
mod_honeypot	Version 2.4 and newer	Third-party extension	Bruce Mitchell, Ueli Heuer	GNU General Public License, Version 2	Blocks requests from IP addresses blacklisted by Project Honey Pot.
mod_http2	Version 2.4 and newer	Included by Default	Apache Software Foundation	Apache License, Version 2.0	Support for the HTTP/2 transport layer.
mod_ical	Version 2.4 and newer	Third party module	Graham Leggett	Apache License, Version 2.0	Allows iCal data to be filtered and made available to client side web clients in iCal, [xCal] and jCal formats.
mod_ident	Version 2.1 and newer	Included by Default	Apache Software Foundation	Apache License, Version 2.0	Identify users based on the Ident Protocol.
mod_imagemap	Version 2.2 and newer	Included by Default	Apache Software Foundation	Apache License, Version 2.0	Server side processing for Image map.
mod_include	Version 1.3 and newer	Included by Default	Apache Software Foundation	Apache License, Version 2.0	Provides an interpreter and support for Server Side Includes.
mod_info	Version 1.1 and newer	Stable Extension	Apache Software Foundation	Apache License, Version 2.0	Provides a web accessible overview of the server configuration.
mod_isapi	Version 1.3 and newer, Win32 only	Included by Default	Apache Software Foundation	Apache License, Version 2.0	Server side processing of Internet Server Application Programming Interface (ISAPI) extensions available for Microsoft Windows.
mod_ipblock	Apache 2.2 and higher	Third-party extension	Marian Marinov	GNU General Public License, Version 2	CIDR-based IPv4 address blocking for aggressive clients.
mod_jk	Version 1.3 and newer	Third-party module	Apache Software Foundation	Apache License, Version 2.0	Gateway from HTTP to the Apache JServ Protocol (AJP). The mod_proxy_ajp module performs a similar function to this module, while being integrated into the mod_proxy framework.
mod_lbmethod_bybusyness	Version 2.3 and newer	Stable Extension	Apache Software Foundation	Apache License, Version 2.0	Pending Request Counting load balancer scheduler algorithm for mod_proxy_balancer.
mod_lbmethod_byrequests	Version 2.3 and newer	Stable Extension	Apache Software Foundation	Apache License, Version 2.0	Request Counting load balancer scheduler algorithm for mod_proxy_balancer.
mod_lbmethod_bytraffic	Version 2.3 and newer	Stable Extension	Apache Software Foundation	Apache License, Version 2.0	Weighted Traffic Counting load balancer scheduler algorithm for mod_proxy_balancer.
mod_lbmethod_heartbeat	Version 2.3 and newer	Stable Extension	Apache Software Foundation	Apache License, Version 2.0	Heartbeat Traffic Counting load balancer scheduler algorithm for mod_proxy_balancer.
mod_ldap	Version 2.0 and newer	Stable Extension	Apache Software Foundation	Apache License, Version 2.0	LDAP connection pooling and result caching services for use by other LDAP modules.
mod_lisp	Version 1.3 and newer	Third-party module	Marc Battyani	Apache License, Version 2.0	Enables Apache to interface with application servers written in Common Lisp.
mod_log_config	Version 1.2 and newer	Included by Default	Apache Software Foundation	Apache License, Version 2.0	Provides flexible logging of client requests in a customizable format.
mod_log_debug	Version 2.3 and newer	Included by Default	Apache Software Foundation	Apache License, Version 2.0	Additional configurable debug logging.
mod_log_forensic	Version 1.3 and newer	Stable Extension	Apache Software Foundation	Apache License, Version 2.0	Forensic Logging of requests made to the server.
mod_logio	Version 2.0 and newer	Stable Extension	Apache Software Foundation	Apache License, Version 2.0	Provides the logging of input and output number of bytes received/sent per request.
mod_lua	Version 2.3 and newer	Included by Default	Apache Software Foundation	Apache License, Version 2.0	Provides Lua hooks into various portions of the httpd request processing.
mod_macro	Version 1.3 and newer	Included by Default	Apache Software Foundation	Apache License	Allows to define and use macros within Apache runtime configuration files.
mod_magick	Version 2.4 and newer	Third party module	Graham Leggett	Apache License, Version 2.0	Provides on-the-fly image filtering for image files hosted by or proxied by the Apache httpd server using GraphicsMagick.
mod_maxminddb	Version 2.2 and above	Third-party module	MaxMind	Apache License, Version 2.0	Looks up the IP address of the client end user. Can be used to perform redirection based on country. Replaces mod_geoip.
mod_md	Version 2.4.30 and newer	Included by Default	Apache Software Foundation	Apache License, Version 2.0	Managing domains across virtual hosts, certificate provisioning via the ACME protocol.
mod_mime	Version 1.3 and newer	Included by Default	Apache Software Foundation	Apache License, Version 2.0	Determines the MIME type of files by mapping the file extension of the file or URI.
mod_mime_magic	Version 1.3 and newer	Stable Extension	Apache Software Foundation	Apache License, Version 2.0	Determines the MIME type of files in the same way the Unix file(1) command works: it looks at the first few bytes of the file. Intended as a "second line of defense" for cases that mod_mime can't resolve.
mod_mruby	Version 2.2 and newer	Third-Party Extension	Matsumoto Ryosuke	MIT License	Embeds a Ruby interpreter in Apache
mod_multipart	Version 2.4 and newer	Third party module	Graham Leggett	Apache License, Version 2.0	Filter that parses multipart MIME content for benefit of other filters.
mod_musicindex	Version 2.0 and newer	Third-party extension	Thibaut Varène	GNU GPLv2.1	Allows nice displaying of directories containing MP3, FLAC, Ogg Vorbis or MP4/AAC files.
mod_negotiation	Version 1.3 and newer	Included by Default	Apache Software Foundation	Apache License, Version 2.0	Provides for Content negotiation.
mod_nw_ssl	Version 2.0 and newer, Netware only	Included by Default	Apache Software Foundation	Apache License, Version 2.0	Enable SSL encryption for NetWare.
mod_ossl	Version 1.3	Third-party module	Oracle	Oracle proprietary (only pre-compiled binaries are provided, no sources)	Support for SSL/TLS encryption based on OpenSSL. The mod_ssl module performs a similar function to this module.
mod_owa	Version 2.0	Third-party module	Oracle	Universal Permissive License v1.0	Oracle PL/SQL gateway for Apache using OCI8 technology.
mod_pagespeed	Version 2.2 and newer	Third Party Module	Google	Apache License, Version 2.0	Rewrites web pages to reduce latency and bandwidth. See
mod_passenger	Version 2.0 and newer	Third Party Module	Phusion	MIT license	Allows requests to be bridged to a Passenger server running Ruby, Python, and Node.js.
mod_perl	Version 1.3 and newer	Stable Extension	Apache Software Foundation	Apache License, Version 2.0	Allows usage of Perl within Apache
mod_php / libphp5	Version 1.3 and newer	Third-party module	The PHP Group	PHP License	Enables usage of PHP within Apache
mod_proxy	Version 1.1 and newer	Stable Extension	Apache Software Foundation	Apache License, Version 2.0	Multi-protocol proxy/gateway server
mod_proxy_ajp	Version 2.1 and newer	Stable Extension	Apache Software Foundation	Apache License, Version 2.0	Apache JServ Protocol (AJP) support module for mod_proxy
mod_proxy_balancer	Version 2.1 and newer	Stable Extension	Apache Software Foundation	Apache License, Version 2.0	Load balancer for mod_proxy
mod_proxy_connect	Version 2.3 and newer	Stable Extension	Apache Software Foundation	Apache License, Version 2.0	CONNECT request handling
mod_proxy_express	Version 2.3 and newer	Stable Extension	Apache Software Foundation	Apache License, Version 2.0	Support for dynamically configured mass reverse proxies
mod_proxy_fcgi	Version 2.4 and newer	Stable extension	Apache Software Foundation	Apache License, Version 2.0	Allows to proxy request through FastCGI
mod_proxy_fdpass	Version 2.4 and newer	Stable extension	Apache Software Foundation	Apache License, Version 2.0	Pass socket descriptors through AF_UNIX domain sockets
mod_proxy_ftp	Version 2.0 and newer	Stable Extension	Apache Software Foundation	Apache License, Version 2.0	FTP support module for mod_proxy
mod_proxy_hcheck	Version 2.4 and newer	Stable Extension	Apache Software Foundation	Apache License, Version 2.0	Dynamic health check of Balancer members (workers) for mod_proxy
mod_proxy_html	Version 2.4 and newer, available as a third-party module for earlier 2.x versions	Stable Extension	Apache Software Foundation	Apache License, Version 2.0	Rewrite HTML links in to ensure they are addressable from Clients' networks in a proxy context.
mod_proxy_http	Version 2.0 and newer	Stable Extension	Apache Software Foundation	Apache License, Version 2.0	HTTP support module for mod_proxy
mod_proxy_http2	Version 2.4 and newer	Stable Extension	Apache Software Foundation	Apache License, Version 2.0	HTTP/2 support module for mod_proxy
mod_proxy_scgi	Version 2.4 and newer	Stable Extension	Apache Software Foundation	Apache License, Version 2.0	SCGI gateway module for mod_proxy
mod_proxy_scgi	Version 2.2 and newer	Stable Extension	Apache Software Foundation	Apache License, Version 2.0	SCGI gateway module for mod_proxy
mod_proxy_uwsgi	Version 2.2 and newer	Stable Extension	Apache Software Foundation	Apache License, Version 2.0	UWSGI gateway module for mod_proxy
mod_proxy_wstunnel	Version 2.4 and newer	Stable Extension	Apache Software Foundation	Apache License, Version 2.0	Websockets support module for mod_proxy
mod_python	Version 2.0 and newer	Third-party module	Gregory Trubetskoy et al.	Apache License, Version 2.0	Allows usage of Python within Apache
mod_qos	Version 2.2	Third-party module	Pascal Buchbinder	GNU General Public License, Version 2	Controls access to the web server to avoid resource oversubscription.
mod_r	Version 1.2.8	Third-Party Extension	Jeffrey Horner	Apache License, Version 2.0	Embeds R interpreter in Apache
mod_rexx	Version 2.4 and newer	Third-party module	Terry Fuller, David Ashley	Common Public License, Version 1.0	Provides an interface for ooRexx to all request phases.
mod_remoteip	Version 2.4 and newer	Included by Default	Apache Software Foundation	Apache License, Version 2.0	Replaces the original client IP address for the connection with the useragent IP address list presented by proxies or a load balancer via the request headers.
mod_rewrite	Version 1.2 and newer	Stable Extension	Apache Software Foundation	Apache License, Version 2.0	URL redirection rewriting often for URL shortening or to accomplish semantic URLs; see URL rewriting
mod_rivet	Version 2.0 and newer	Third-Party Extension	Apache Software Foundation	Apache License, Version 2.0	Embeds a Tcl interpreter in Apache
mod_security	Version 1.3 and newer	Third-party module	OWASP Foundation	Apache License, Version 2.0	Native implementation of the web application firewall, working as an Apache module. Both major Apache branches are supported.
mod_setenvif	Version 1.3 and newer	Included by Default	Apache Software Foundation	Apache License, Version 2.0	Allows the setting of environment variables based on characteristics of the request.
mod_setenvifplus	Version 2.2 and newer	Third-party module	Pascal Buchbinder	Apache License, Version 2.0	Allows Apache to set environment variables based on different parts of a request parsed by regular expressions and encode/decode Base64.
mod_so	Version 1.3 and newer	Stable Extension	Apache Software Foundation	Apache License, Version 2.0	On selected operating systems this module can be used to load modules into Apache HTTP Server at runtime via the Dynamic Shared Object (DSO) mechanism, rather than requiring a recompilation.
mod_speling	Version 1.3 and newer	Stable Extension	Apache Software Foundation	Apache License, Version 2.0	Attempts to correct mistaken URLs that users might have entered by ignoring capitalization and by allowing up to one misspelling.
mod_ssl	Version 2.0 and newer	Stable Extension	Apache Software Foundation	Apache License, Version 2.0	Strong cryptography using the Transport Layer Security (TLS) protocol.
mod_sslcrl	Version 2.2	Third-party module	Pascal Buchbinder	Apache License, Version 2.0	Verifies the validity of client certificates against Certificate Revocation Lists (CRL)
mod_status	Version 1.1 and newer	Included by Default	Apache Software Foundation	Apache License, Version 2.0	Provides information on server activity and performance.
mod_substitute	Version 2.2.7 and newer	Included by Default	Apache Software Foundation	Apache License, Version 2.0	Perform search and replace operations on response bodies.
mod_suexec	Version 2.0 and newer	Stable Extension	Apache Software Foundation	Apache License, Version 2.0	Allows users to run CGI and SSI applications as a different user.
mod_tile	Version 2.0 and newer	Third-party module		GNU General Public License, Version 2	Apache 2 module to deliver map tiles for the OpenStreetMap.
mod_torcheck	Version 2.2 and newer	Third-party extension	Yoyodyne	GNU General Public License, Version 2	Blocks requests from Tor exit nodes.
mod_unique_id	Version 1.3 and newer	Stable Extension	Apache Software Foundation	Apache License, Version 2.0	Provides a magic token for each request which is guaranteed to be unique across all requests under very specific conditions.
mod_userdir	Version 1.3 and newer	Included by Default	Apache Software Foundation	Apache License, Version 2.0	Allows user-specific directories to be accessed using the http://example.com/~user/ syntax.
mod_usertrack	Version 1.2 and newer	Stable Extension	Apache Software Foundation	Apache License, Version 2.0	Provides tracking of a user through a website via browser cookies.
mod_version	Version 2.0.56 and newer	Stable Extension	Apache Software Foundation	Apache License, Version 2.0	Allows version dependent configuration with the container <IfVersion>.
mod_vhost_alias	Version 1.37 and newer	Stable Extension	Apache Software Foundation	Apache License, Version 2.0	Creates dynamically configured virtual hosts, by allowing the IP address or the host: header of the HTTP request to be used as part of the pathname to determine what files to serve.
mod_wasm	Version 2.4 and newer	Third-party module	VMware's Wasm Labs	Apache License, Version 2.0	Enables the usage of WebAssembly (Wasm) modules in Apache Server. This module will allow to execute certain tasks in the backend in a very efficient and secure way.
mod_wsgi	Version 1.3 and higher	Third-party module	Graham Dumpleton	Apache License, Version 2.0	Module that hosts Python web applications which implement the WSGI specification (PEP 3333).
mod_xml2enc	Version 2.4 and newer	Stable Extension	Apache Software Foundation	Apache License, Version 2.0	Transcoding module that can be used to extend the internationalisation support of libxml2-based filter modules by converting encoding before or after the filter has run. Thus an unsupported input charset can be converted to UTF-8, and output can also be converted to another charset if required.

The following is a list of historical first- and third-party modules available for prior versions of the Apache web server:

Name	Compatibility	Status	Developer(s)	License	Description
mod_access	Versions older than 2.1	Included by Default	Apache Software Foundation	Apache License, Version 2.0	Provides access control based on the client and the client's request
mod_aspdotnet				Apache License, Version 2.0	No longer under the Apache Software Foundation umbrella. Development has been resumed by the original authors at its new home, the mod-aspdotnet SourceForge project.
mod_auth	Versions older than 2.1	Included by Default	Apache Software Foundation	Apache License, Version 2.0	Authenticates users via Basic access authentication by checking against plaintext password and group files. In Apache 2.1 and later, this plaintext authentication is enabled by mod_authn_file instead.
mod_auth_anon	Versions 1.1-2.1	Stable Extension	Apache Software Foundation	Apache License, Version 2.0	Allows authentication with a special user id of "anonymous" and an email address as the password. As an authentication mechanism, this was replaced by mod_authn_anon.
mod_auth_db	Versions 1.1-1.3	Stable Extension	Apache Software Foundation	Apache License, Version 2.0	Provides user authentication using Berkeley DB files.
mod_auth_dbm	Versions older than 2.1	Stable Extension	Apache Software Foundation	Apache License, Version 2.0	This module provides for HTTP Basic Authentication, where the usernames and passwords are stored in DBM type database files. It is an alternative to the plain text password files provided by mod_auth.
mod_auth_kerb	Version 1.3 to 2.2	Third-party extension	Masarykova Universita	MIT License	Using the Basic Auth mechanism, it retrieves a username/password pair from the browser and checks them against a Kerberos server. Replaced by mod_auth_gssapi.
mod_auth_ldap	Versions 2.0.41-2.1	Experimental Extension	Apache Software Foundation	Apache License, Version 2.0	Allows HTTP Basic Authentication by checking against an LDAP directory. The authentication mechanism of checking against an LDAP directory is provided via mod_authnz_ldap in Apache versions 2.1 and later.
mod_auth_ntlm_winbind	Version 1.3 and newer	Third-party extension	Andrew Bartlett	BSD License	Implements NTLM authentication for Apache on Unix platforms. Derived from mod_ntlm.
mod_auth_oid	Version 2.2	Third-party module	Pascal Buchbinder	Apache License, Version 2.0	Allows an Apache server to act as an OpenID "Relying Party"
mod_authn_alias	Version 2.1 and 2.2	Stable Extension	Apache Software Foundation	Apache License, Version 2.0	This module allows extended authentication providers to be created within the configuration file and assigned an alias name. The alias providers can then be referenced through the directives AuthBasicProvider or AuthDigestProvider in the same way as a base authentication provider. This functionality was moved to mod_authn_core in v2.4.
mod_authn_default	Version 2.1 and 2.2	Included by Default	Apache Software Foundation	Apache License, Version 2.0	This module is designed to be the fallback module, if you don't have an authentication module like mod_auth_basic configured. It simply rejects any credentials supplied by the user. This functionality was removed in v2.4.
mod_authnz_mysql	Version 2.2				This module provides both authentication and authorization for the Apache 2.2 webserver like mod-authnz-ldap . It uses a MySQL database to retrieve user and group informations.
mod_backhand	Version 1.3	Third-party module	Yair Amir, Theo Schlossnagle		Seamless redirection of HTTP requests from one web server to another. Can be used to target machines with under-utilized resources.
mod_balancer					
mod_bandwidth	Version 1.2 to 2.1	Third-party module	Yann Stettler and CohProg SàRL	Apache License, Version 1.1	Server-wide or per connection bandwidth limits, based on the directory, size of files and remote IP/domain.
mod_bonjour					
mod_bw					The httpd web server doesn't really have a way to control how much resources a given virtual host can have/ a user can request. This module should be able to limit access to certain areas of the website and to limit malicious users.
mod_bwlimited					mod_bwlimited is a CPanel module that allows limiting and monitoring of bandwidth and connection speed etc. It allows CPanel to give very accurate reports of bandwidth usage on HTTP, HTTPS, FTP, SMTP and a few other services as well as limiting bandwidth usage and connection speed. The module is only available on servers running CPanel and isn't available anywhere else
mod_c		Third-party module			Cache DLL/SO executables to create very high speed dynamic web pages. mod_c is supported by EHTML (executable HTML)
mod_celerity	Version 1.3 and newer	Stable Extension	MP Solutions, LLC.	MIT License	Provides communications to Modern Pascal's Celerity Engine
mod_cidrblock	Version 2.2 and newer	Third-party extension	Yoyodyne	GNU General Public License, Version 2	Blocks requests from a user-specified list of CIDR blocks
mod_csrf	Version 2.0 (and newer ?)	Third Party	chrishypernetch, ia97lies, pbuchbinder	GNU, Version 2.1	Provides a token based validation layer in order to mitigate CRSF/XSRF request.
mod_define	Version 1.3 and newer	Third Party		Apache License, Version 2.0	Definition of variables for arbitrary directives.
mod_disk_cache	Version 2.0 to 2.3	Stable Extension	Apache Software Foundation	Apache License, Version 2.0	Renamed to mod_cache_disk in Apache httpd v2.3.
mod_example	Version 1.2 and newer	Experimental Extension	Apache Software Foundation	Apache License, Version 2.0	The example module is an actual working module. If you link it into your server, enable the "example-handler" handler for a location, and then browse to that location, you will see a display of some of the tracing the example module did as the various callbacks were made.
mod_extract					
mod_fcgid	Version 2.0, 2.2 and 2.4	Stable Extension	Apache Software Foundation	Apache License, Version 2.0	mod_fcgid is a high performance alternative to mod_cgi or mod_cgid, which starts a sufficient number instances of the CGI program to handle concurrent requests, and these programs remain running to handle further incoming requests. It is favored by the PHP developers, for example, as a preferred alternative to running mod_php in-process, delivering very similar performance.
mod_fastcgi					This 3rd party module provides support for the FastCGI protocol. FastCGI is a language independent, scalable, open extension to CGI that provides high performance and persistence without the limitations of server specific APIs.
mod_flvx					Stream Flash video
mod_frontpage					Starts a service for Microsoft FrontPage.
mod_frontpage Mirfak				Apache License, Version 2.0	Mirfak is an open-source mod_frontpage reimplementation that is more secure, and can be used with a binary installation of Apache (possibly including mod_ssl, php, etc.). The module is licensed under the Apache license.
mod_geoip	Version 2.0 and above	Third-party module	MaxMind	Apache License, Version 1.1	Looks up the IP address of the client end user. Can be used to perform redirection based on country. Deprecated and replaced with mod_maxminddb.
mod_gzip	Version 1.3 to 2.0	Third-party module	Kevin Kiley, Konstantin Balashov	Apache License, Version 2.0	Perform on-the-fly DEFLATE compression. Replaced by mod_deflate.
mod_h264_streaming	Version 2.2 and newer	Third-party module	CodeShop	Dual (cc BY-NC-SA or commercial)	H264 Streaming Module.
mod_ibm_ssl	Version 2.2 and up	Third-party module			SSL/TLS support for the IBM HTTP Server, a derivative of the Apache HTTP Server.
mod_imap	Version 1.2-2.0	Included by Default	Apache Software Foundation	Apache License, Version 2.0	Server side processing for Image map. This module was renamed to mod_imagemap from v2.2 onwards.
mod_mem_cache	Version 2.0 to 2.3	Stable Extension	Apache Software Foundation	Apache License, Version 2.0	Replaced by mod_cache_socache. Removed in Apache httpd v2.3.
mod_mono	Version 2.0 and newer	Third-party extension	Xamarin (Microsoft)	Apache License, Version 2.0	Supports running ASP.NET applications and sites on top of the Mono (software) framework. Repository archived on 19 November 2023.
mod_nsf	Version 2.2 and newer	Third-party extension	Yoyodyne	GNU General Public License, Version 2	Timed blacklisting for IPs requesting nonexistent URLs
mod_nss	Version 2.2 and newer	Third-party extension		Apache License, Version 2.0	SSL provider derived from the mod_ssl module for the Apache web server that uses the Network Security Services. Retired on 7 November 2024.
mod_ntlm	Version 1.3 and newer	Third-party extension	Andreas Gal	BSD License	Implements NTLM authentication for Apache on Unix platforms.
mod_oc4j	Version 1.3	Third-party module	Oracle	Oracle proprietary (only pre-compiled binaries are provided, no sources)	Gateway from HTTP to the Apache JServ Protocol (AJP). The mod_proxy_ajp module performs a similar function to this module, while being integrated into the mod_proxy framework.
mod_openpgp	Version 2.0 and newer	Third-party module	Arturo "Buanzo" Busleiman	Unknown	OpenPGP signed HTTP Requests.
mod_parrot	Version 2.2 and newer	Third-party module	Jeff Horwitz	Artistic-2.0 license	Exposes the Apache API to a Parrot virtual machine interpreter.
mod_psgi	Version 2.2 and newer	Third-party module	Jiro Nishiguchi	Apache License, Version 2.0	Implements the PSGI specification within Apache
mod_ruby	Version 1.3 and newer	Third-Party Extension	Shugo Maeda	Apache License, Version 2.0	Embeds a Ruby interpreter in Apache
mod_spambot	Version 1.3 and newer	Third-Party Extension	Nigel Horne	GNU General Public License, Version 2	Blocks bots and harvesters
mod_spamhaus	Version 2.2 and newer	Third-party extension	Luca Ercoli	GNU General Public License, Version 2	Blocks requests from IPs on Spamhaus block list.
mod_auth_sspi	Version 1.3 to Version 2.2	Third-party extension	Tim Costello	Apache License, Version 2.0	SSPI authentication module which let users authenticate against Win32 domains. Replaced by mod_authnz_sspi.
mod_suphp	Version 1.3 to Version 2.2	Third-party extension	Sebastian Marsching	GNU General Public License, Version 2	Allow PHP scripts to safely run as the script owner rather than the Apache webserver user.
mod_tidy	Version 2.0/2.2	Third-party module	Sierk Bornemann, Günter Knauf	Apache License, Version 2.0	HTML Tidy resp. Libtidy based module that parses, cleans up and pretty-prints the web server (X)HTML output.
mod_transform	Version 2.0	Third-party module	Nick Kew	GNU General Public License, Version 2	Filter module that allows Apache to do dynamic XSL Transformations on either static XML documents, or XML documents generated from another Apache module or CGI program.
mod_upload	Version 2.0/2.2	Third-party module	Nick Kew	GNU General Public License, Version 2	Input filter module for multipart/form-data, as submitted from File Upload forms on the Web.
mod_uploader	Version 2.0 and higher	Third-party module	Tetsuya Kimata	zlib License	Functions as a web-based file-sharing system.
mod_virgule	Version 1.3 and higher	Third-party module	Raph Levien	GNU GPLv2	Module that formed the source code to Advogato.
mod_whitelist	Version 2.4	Third-party module		MIT License	IP whitelisting based on a MySQL table see github repository
mod_wl	Depends on module version	Third-party module	Oracle	Oracle proprietary (only pre-compiled binaries are provided, no sources)	Enables working as a proxy for BEA/Oracle WebLogic
mod_wl_20	Version 2.0	Third-party module	Oracle	Oracle proprietary (only pre-compiled binaries are provided, no sources)	Enables working as a proxy for BEA/Oracle WebLogic
mod_wl_22	Version 2.2	Third-party module	Oracle	Oracle proprietary (only pre-compiled binaries are provided, no sources)	Enables working as a proxy for BEA/Oracle WebLogic
mod_wl_24	Version 2.4	Third-party module	Oracle	Oracle proprietary (only pre-compiled binaries are provided, no sources)	Enables working as a proxy for BEA/Oracle WebLogic
mod_xsendfile				Apache License, Version 2.0	
mod_xml					
mod_xslt					
mod_xml_curl					
mod_xmlrpc					
mod_xrv					
mod_zlib					
