= Mod ruby =

mod_ruby
- Stable release: 1.3.0 / November 8, 2008; 17 years ago
- Website: http://www.modruby.net
- Repository: github.com/shugo/mod_ruby

mod_ruby is a module that embeds the Ruby interpreter into the Apache web server to allow Ruby code to execute natively, faster than other CGI methods. Its drawback is that the characteristic sharing of classes among Apache processes is not safe for multiple applications (e.g., multiple Ruby on Rails applications running simultaneously).

There is also the similar mod_mruby for mruby, a lightweight Ruby implementation.

As of at least 2015, the project seems to no longer be under active development.

== See also ==
- Phusion Passenger (mod_rails/mod_rack)
- mod_perl
- mod_php
- mod_python
- mod_wsgi
