= Mod lisp =

mod_lisp is an extension module for the Apache HTTP Server. It enables Apache to interface with application servers written in Common Lisp, making it possible to dynamically generate web pages and provide web applications with Common Lisp programs.

Unlike other mod_* projects, such as mod_perl and mod_python, mod_lisp does not embed a Common Lisp interpreter in Apache. In concept it is closer to FastCGI, handling requests by serializing them into a textual representation and sending that over a socket to a persistent Common Lisp program, and then sending the Common Lisp system's response to a client. The client may be a web browser, but is more likely to be a reverse proxy server. It is this server that interacts with the user's browser.

The source (FreeBSD style license), Common Lisp examples and pre-compiled binaries for FreeBSD, Linux and Win32 are available on the mod_lisp web site.
