= IPlanet =

Software company

iPlanet
- Product type: E-commerce
- Current owner: Oracle Corporation
- Introduced: January 1999
- Previous owners: Netscape Communications Corporation; Sun Microsystems
- Website: iPlanet.com at the Wayback Machine (archived 2001-02-02)

iPlanet was a product brand that was used jointly by Sun Microsystems and Netscape Communications Corporation when delivering software and services as part of a non-exclusive cross marketing deal that was also known as "A Sun|Netscape Alliance".

== History ==
After AOL merged with Netscape, technology analysts speculated that AOL's major interest was the netscape.com website (specifically the millions of registered users thereof), and to a lesser extent the Netscape Communicator suite, which some considered would be used to replace the Internet Explorer browser which AOL licensed from Microsoft and included as part of their software suite.

AOL entered into an agreement with systems and software company Sun Microsystems whereby engineers from both companies would work together on software development, marketing, sales, installation and support. Part of the deal was that Sun agreed to pay Netscape a fixed amount for each year of the deal regardless of whether any software was actually sold by the alliance.

The iPlanet brand was already owned by Sun following the acquisition of i-Planet, Inc. in October 1998 (i-Planet was founded just two years before in January 1996).

In 2001, the three year alliance came to an end, at which point, under the terms of the deal, both AOL and Sun retained equal rights to the code that had been jointly developed. Toward the end of August 2001 many of the remaining Netscape employees were either laid off or transferred to Sun (mostly at its campuses in Santa Clara, California and Bangalore). During the period of the alliance, Netscape had hired very few people, most staff coming under the Sun umbrella.

AOL had continued to market the directory and certificate server products under the Netscape brand. But in 2004 AOL sold the directory and certificate server products to Red Hat, which open-sourced them and integrated both into its Red Hat Enterprise Server product portfolio (Red Hat Directory Server and Certificate System).

Most of the other iPlanet products were moved to the Sun ONE brand and then the Sun Java System brand.

After the Oracle acquisition of Sun, some of the former iPlanet products returned to be sold under the iPlanet brand, specifically Oracle iPlanet Web Server and Oracle iPlanet Web Proxy Server.

== Products ==
The suite of iPlanet offerings included:

- iPlanet Application Server (a Java EE application server system, based on the Netscape Application Server and NetDynamics Application Server)
- iPlanet Calendar Server
- iPlanet Directory Server (an LDAP server), renamed to Sun Java System Directory Server
- iPlanet Instant Messaging Server
- iPlanet Messaging Server (a SMTP, IMAP, POP3 and webmail mail server)
- iPlanet Meta Directory
- iPlanet Portal Search (formerly Netscape Compass)
- iPlanet Portal Server
- iPlanet Web Server (an HTTP and HTTPS web server), renamed to Sun Java System Web Server
- iPlanet Web Proxy Server, renamed to Sun Java System Web Proxy Server

The suite also included a number of server-side infrastructure components, including distributed event management and tools for managing large populations of iPlanet server instances.

Additionally, iPlanet sold "iPlanet E-Commerce Applications", a suite of software tools intended for building e-commerce websites:

- iPlanet BillerXpert (for handling billing and related financial processing activities)
- iPlanet BuyerXpert (for business-to-business procurement software)
- iPlanet ECXpert
- iPlanet MerchantXpert
- iPlanet SellerXpert (for implementing b2b and b2c sales websites)
- iPlanet TradingXpert
- Netscape PublishingXpert
