= Mobile Web Server =

Software for smartphones to host web servers

- Original author: Robert McCool
- Developers: Apache Software Foundation, Nokia Research
- Release: 23 October 2007
- Stable release: 1.5 / 18 November 2008
- Written in: C, C++, Java
- Operating system: All POSIX (Linux/BSD/Unix-like OSes), Symbian OS, S60 platform, Android
- Available in: English
- Type: Web server
- License: Apache License 2.0
- Website: https://code.google.com/p/i-jetty/

A Mobile Web Server is software designed for modern-day smartphones to host personal web servers through the use of open sourced software.

Nokia is one of the few cellphone companies that brought Apache HTTP Server to their line of Nokia cellphones, running Symbian OS S60 mobile software platform. The S60 Mobile Web Server enables connectivity for HTTP traffic to a mobile device from the Internet.

The Mobile Web Server components include a gateway application that runs on a computer with Internet access and a connector application, that runs on the remote mobile device. The gateway and the connector applications with a valid DNS configuration can provide a mobile device with a global web address (URL). However, as of January 2010, the web server project has been discontinued by Nokia.

== Examples ==
The Mobile Web Server application allows mobile devices a means for hosting personal web applications, including, web pages and server side control. The most commonly used HTTP servers and servlet containers currently available are Jetty, Tomcat, Glassfish and Resin.

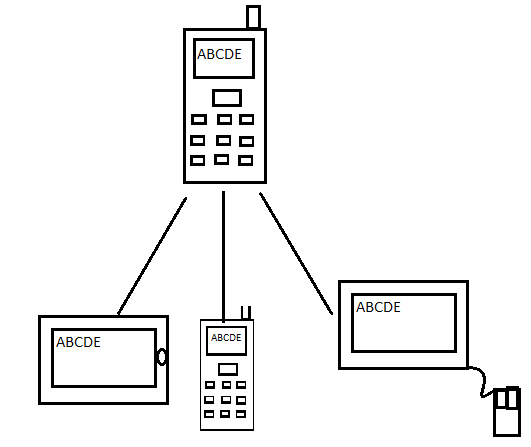

The diagram on the left demonstrates a general understanding of a mobile device containing a servlet container, such as, Jetty, Tomcat, Glassfish and Resin. Allowing global hosting through a personalized device, creating functionality and complete user control. Configurations within the Mobile Web Server allows optimization, account management and instant synchronized information across all platforms, regardless of a desktop, laptop or cellphone.

== Web container comparison ==
Different Containers and versions	Java API (Version)	Ant tasks (Version)	Maven 2 plugin (Version)
GlassFish 2.x	1.0.1	1.0.1	1.0.1
GlassFish 3.x	1.0.1	1.0.1	1.0.1
Jetty 4.x	0.1	1.0	0.2
Jetty 5.x	0.8	1.0	0.2
Jetty 6.x	0.8	1.0	0.2
Jetty 7.x	1.0.1	1.0.1	1.0.1
Jetty 8.x	1.1.3	1.1.3	1.1.3
Jetty 9.x	1.3.0	1.3.0	1.3.0
Resin 2.x	0.1	0.1	0.1
Resin 3.x	0.1	0.1	0.1
Resin 3.1.x	1.2.0	1.2.0	1.2.0
Tomcat 4.x	0.1	0.1	0.1
Tomcat 5.x	0.1	0.1	0.1
Tomcat 6.x	1.0	1.0	1.0
Tomcat 7.x	1.0.2	1.0.2	1.0.2

== Features ==
- Personal information manager (PIM) Manage phone's address book
- Helix multimedia player
- Send SMS messages using a web browser
- Browse phone's calendar
- Browse camera phone's image gallery via computer
- View received and missed calls
- Get instant messages sent to your phone screen.
- Maintain a blog
- Share presence status
- Online chat
- Manage access rights
- Start mobile site from the web or Settings
- Share mobile site content via RSS feeds

== See also ==
- Python for S60
- Apache Tomcat, alternative open source web server and servlet container
- ApacheBench, a program for measuring the performance of HTTP web servers
