= List of application servers =

This list compares the features and functionality of application servers, grouped by the hosting environment that is offered by that particular application server.

== C++ ==
- Tuxedo – Based on the ATMI standard, is one of the original application servers.
- Wt – A web toolkit similar to Qt permitting GUI-application-like web development with built-in Ajax abilities.
- POCO C++ Libraries – A set of open source class libraries including Poco.Net.HTTPServer.html

== Java ==
Product	Vendor	Edition	Last release	Jakarta EE compatibility	Servlet	JSP	HTTP/2	License
ColdFusion	Adobe Systems	2016.0.1	2016-05-01	7 partial platform	3.1	2.3	No	Proprietary, commercial
Enterprise Server	Borland	6.7	2007-01	1.4	2.4	2.0	No	Proprietary, commercial
Geronimo	ASF	3.0.1	2013-05-28	6 full platform	3.0	2.2	No	Free, Apache
GlassFish	Eclipse Foundation	7.0.19	2024-11-01	10 full platform	6.0	3.1	Yes	Free, EPL, GPL + classpath exception
JBoss Enterprise Application Platform	Red Hat	8.1	2025-08-28	10 full platform	6.0	3.1	Yes	Free, LGPL
Jetty	Eclipse Foundation	12.0.8	2024-04-03	10 full platform	6.0	3.1	Yes	Free, Apache 2.0, EPL
JEUS	TmaxSoft	8	2013-08	7 full platform	3.0	2.2	No	Proprietary, commercial
Lucee (Formerly Railo)	Lucee Association Switzerland	5.3.2.77	2019-05-27	7 partial platform	3.1	2.3	No	Free, CDDL, GPL + classpath exception
NetWeaver Application Server	SAP AG	7.4	2013-01-11	5	2.5	2.1	No	Proprietary, commercial
Oracle Containers for J2EE	Oracle Corporation	10.1.3.5.0	2009-08	1.4	2.4	2.0	No	Proprietary, commercial
Orion Application Server	IronFlare	2.0.7	2006-03-09	1.3	2.3	1.2	No	Proprietary, commercial
Payara Server	Payara Services	6.2025.1	2025-01-01	10 full platform	6.0	3.1	Yes	Free, CDDL, GPL + classpath exception
Resin Servlet Container (open source)	Caucho Technology	4.0.62	2019-05-23	6 Web Profile	3.0	2.2	No	Free, GPL
Resin Professional Application Server	Caucho Technology	4.0.62	2019-05-23	6 Web Profile	3.0	2.2	No	Proprietary, commercial
Tomcat	ASF	10.1.10	2023-06-23	9 partial platform	6.0	3.1	Yes	Free, Apache v2
TomEE	ASF	8.0.15	2023-05-08	8 Web Profile	4.0	2.3	Yes	Free, Apache v2
WebLogic Server	Oracle Corporation (formerly BEA Systems)	14.1.1.0.0	2020-03-30	8 full platform	4.0	2.3	Yes	Proprietary, commercial
IBM WebSphere Application Server	IBM	24.0.0.5	2024-05-21	10 full platform,	6.0	3.1	Yes	Proprietary, commercial
WebSphere AS Community Edition	IBM	3.0.0.4	2013-06-21	6 full platform	3.0	2.2	No	Proprietary, commercial
WildFly (formerly JBoss AS)	Red Hat (formerly JBoss)	42.0.0.Final	2026-10-22	11 full platform	6.1	4.0	Yes	Free, Apache v2

- Apache MINA – an abstract event-driven asynchronous API over various transports such as TCP/IP and UDP/IP via Java NIO
- Netty – a non-blocking I/O client-server framework for the development of Java network applications similar in spirit to Node.js

== JavaScript ==
- Broadvision – Server-side JavaScript AS. One of the early entrants in the market during the eCommerce dot-com bubble, they have vertical solution packages catering to the eCommerce industry.
- Bun – implements Apple's JavaScriptCore engine as a standalone (outside the browser) asynchronous Javascript interpreter. An open-source project with its own npm-compatible package manager, and many built APIs, tooling and utilities.
- Node.js – implements Google's V8 engine as a standalone (outside the browser) asynchronous Javascript interpreter. A vigorous open-source developer community on GitHub has implemented many supporting products, notably npm for package management and Connect and Express app server layers.
- Deno – community developed Rust project, spearheaded by Ryan Dahl who also created Node.js, it directly targets TypeScript but also supports JavaScript and WebAssembly via V8; employs asynchronous, event-based I/O model via promise-based APIs and Tokio scheduler, uses an API security model via FlatBuffers and implements package management via ES2015 modules.
- Phusion Passenger

== LPC ==
- Dworkin's Game Driver (DGD)

== Lua ==
- OpenResty
- Tarantool

== .NET ==
=== Microsoft ===
Microsoft positions their middle-tier applications and services infrastructure in the Windows Server operating system and the .NET Framework technologies in the role of an application server:

- Internet Information Services web server
- .NET Framework (Windows Communication Foundation, Web Services, .NET Remoting, Microsoft Message Queuing (MSMQ), ASP.NET, ADO.NET)
- Distributed Transactions, COM+
- Active Directory Lightweight Directory Service (ADLDS), Active Directory Federation Services (ADFS), Authorization Manager

=== Third-party ===
- Mono – Developed by Xamarin, licensed under MIT

== Objective-C ==
- GNUstepWeb - WebObjects 4.5 compatible, licensed under LGPL

== PHP ==
- Appserver.io, an open-source PHP application server.
- RoadRunner, built by Spiral Scout is high-performance PHP application server, load-balancer and process manager written in Golang.

== Python ==
- uWSGI
- Gunicorn
- CherryPy
- Google App Engine
- mod_python
- mod_wsgi
- Phusion Passenger
- Tornado
- Twisted
- Web2py
- Zope – By Zope, Inc.

== Ruby ==
- Mongrel
- Passenger
- Puma
- Unicorn

== Smalltalk ==
- Seaside – A continuations based web application server

== Tcl ==
- AOLserver – Forked from NaviServer after developer was bought by AOL in 1995
- NaviServer – Resumed independent development after AOL dropped AOLserver support.

== Container Based ==
Container based application servers run each application in a container. The application can be written in any programming language.

- OpenRun - Application server implemented in Go, which builds and runs web applications in a container.

== See also ==
- Content management systems
- Web framework
- Comparison of server-side web frameworks
- Comparison of server-side JavaScript solutions
- Comparison of web server software
