= WCAP =

WCAP may refer to:

- WCAP (AM), a radio station (980 AM) licensed to Lowell, Massachusetts
- WCAP (Washington, D.C.), a defunct radio station in Washington, D.C., which was on-air from June 1923 to July 1926
- WOBM (AM), a radio station (1310 AM) licensed to Asbury Park, New Jersey, which held the call sign WCAP from 1928 to 1950
- Web Calendar Access Protocol
- United States Air Force World Class Athlete Program, a United States Air Force unit headquartered in Colorado Springs, Colorado
- U.S. Army World Class Athlete Program, a United States Army unit headquartered at Fort Carson, Colorado
