= Milind Ramesh Phadke =

Indian judicial officer

- Occupation: Judge
- Known for: Judgments
- Office: Madhya Pradesh High Court

Milind Ramesh Phadke is an indian judge at the Madhya Pradesh High Court. He also served as Assistant Solicitor General of India.

== Career ==
He served as Assistant Solicitor General of India (ASGI) for the Madhya Pradesh High Court's Indore Bench before his resignation was accepted on 22 February 2022.
