= Caucho =

Caucho may refer to:

- Natural rubber
- Caucho Technology, an American information technology company
