= Mod proxy =

Apache module

mod_proxy is an optional module for the Apache HTTP Server.

This module implements a proxy, gateway or cache for Apache. It implements proxying capability for AJP13 (Apache JServ Protocol version 1.3), FTP, CONNECT (for SSL), HTTP/0.9, HTTP/1.0, and (since Apache 1.3.23) HTTP/1.1. The module can be configured to connect to other proxy modules for these and other protocols.

One powerful feature of Apache is flexible virtual hosting—multiple virtual hosts on a single server. This is a convenient way to partition separate websites and applications. With mod_proxy it is possible to set various web framework-based applications up as virtual hosts as well.

mod_proxy can help to improve LAMP security or to strip SSL from HTTP requests.

== History ==
This module was experimental in Apache 1.1.x.

As of Apache 1.2, mod_proxy stability was greatly improved.

Since Apache 2.0, proxy features are divided into several modules in addition to mod_proxy: mod_proxy_http, mod_proxy_ftp, and mod_proxy_connect — moreover, caching is provided by mod_cache and related modules.

Since Apache 2.2, mod_proxy_ajp and mod_proxy_balancer have been added as well.

As of Apache 2.4, mod_proxy_fcgi was also added, to proxy FastCGI requests to another server, superseding mod_fcgid and mod_fastcgi.

== See also ==
- Some general purpose Apache modules
- Some programming language interfaces for Apache
