= Oracle Communications Messaging Server =

Oracle Communications Messaging Server is Oracle's messaging (email) server software. The software was obtained by Oracle as part of the company's acquisition of Sun in 2010.

Oracle's Messaging Server could potentially be the most widely deployed commercial email server on the planet, with claims of 150 million mailboxes deployed worldwide (mostly by ISPs, telcos, universities, government, and cable TV broadband providers).

== History of development ==
Oracle Communications Messaging Server has a long history, drawing technology from

- Sun Internet Mail Server (SIMS)
- Netscape Messaging Server (NMS)
- PMDF from Innosoft

In addition to the Messaging Server's three parents, the software has undergone multiple brand naming changes:

- iPlanet Messaging Server
- Sun ONE Messaging Server
- Sun Java System Messaging Server
- Oracle Communications Messaging Exchange Server
- Oracle Communications Messaging Server

The code base has been carried on throughout these minor brand changes with only feature enhancements and bug fixes.

The Messaging Server was part of Sun's Java Enterprise System bundle of Internet/Intranet server software from 2003 to 2006. In 2006, the Messaging Server was packaged as part of smaller bundle called the Sun Java System Communications Suite which includes Sun Java System Calendar Server, Sun Java System Instant Messaging Server, and Sun Java System Communications Express. This suite is now known as Oracle Communications Unified Communications Suite.

Supporting server software for the Messaging Server includes Sun Java System Directory Server, Sun Java System Access Manager, and Oracle iPlanet Web Server. The supporting software is included in the Communications Suite bundle with limited-use license rights. Messaging Server also includes a web application called Convergence, which provides webmail as well as web-based access to other Communications Suite functionality such as calendaring and instant messaging.

The Messaging Server is supported to run on multiple operating systems including Solaris and Red Hat Enterprise Linux. Versions 5.2, 6.1 and 6.2 were also available for HP-UX and Microsoft Windows.
