= Sun Java System Calendar Server =

The Sun Java System Calendar Server was Sun's calendar (scheduling) server. The currently available version is 6.3 which is now part of the Sun Java System Communications Suite.

Users can access their calendar and task list items using a variety of clients. Web browsers will be able to access Calendar data using Sun Java System Communications Express as an HTML-based client. Microsoft Outlook users can access their calendar data using the Sun Java System Connector for Microsoft Outlook, which is not yet compatible with Outlook 2010. Mozilla Thunderbird users can add fully functional calendar access to the Sun Calendar Server to the email software by adding the Mozilla Lightning extension for WCAP (Web Calendar Access Protocol). Finally, starting in 2008, the Sun Java System Communications Suite 6 will include an AJAX-based Web client which will provide better "thick client-like" user interactions.

A useful feature of Calendar Server is the notification service. This service will send an e-mail or an SMS to the calendar owner. These messages are sent to the calendar owner if he/she has been invited to an appointment or as a reminder of an upcoming appointment. These reminders are directed to a person's cell phone by using their phone carrier's email address assigned to their phone.

The notification services are also useful for developers to implement their own software applications. Calendar reminders and change events are published to a Java Message Service using Sun Java System Message Queue.

Developers may use the WCAP interface to write their own applications which access calendars, tasks, and look up "free busy" information on users. This interface returns calendar data in a number of formats including XML and iCalendar. JSON (JavaScript Object Notation) format was added to support AJAX development in the latest patch of Calendar Server 6.3.

== History and use ==
Sun's Java System Calendar Server has a long history, drawing technology from Sun Internet Calendar Server (SICS) and Netscape Calendar Server (NCS). The software has undergone several name changes; in addition to the above, it has also been marketed as iPlanet Calendar Server and Sun ONE Calendar Server. The code base has been carried on throughout these name changes with only feature/packaging enhancements and bug fixes.

Since 2003, the Calendar Server has been included as part of Sun's Java Enterprise System, a collection of infrastructure software applications and tools. It is also available as part of the Sun Java System Communications Suite, a smaller collection of messaging and collaboration services that includes Sun Java System Messaging Server, Sun Java System Instant Messaging Server, and Sun Java System Communications Express. Supporting server software for the Calendar Server includes Sun Java System Directory Server, Sun Java System Access Manager, and Sun Java System Web Server. The supporting software is included in the Communications Suite bundle with limited-use license rights.

Calendar Express was the original web-based client interface for the Calendar Server. This HTML client allowed Calendar owners to create appointments, invite others to meetings, and to subscribe to other calendars. The Calendar Express web-client was dropped from support starting with Sun Java System Calendar Server 6.3. This client functionality has been replaced by Sun Java System Communications Express.

The Calendar Server version 6.3 is supported on multiple operating systems including Sun's Solaris and Red Hat Enterprise Linux. HP-UX and Microsoft Windows have since been dropped from support starting with version 6.3.
