= NCSA HTTPd =

Discontinued web server software

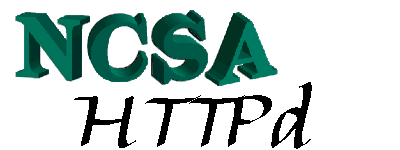
- Original author: Robert McCool
- Developer: University of Illinois at Urbana–Champaign
- Release: 1993; 33 years ago
- Final release: 1.5.2a / 8 October 1996; 29 years ago
- Available in: English
- Type: Web server
- Website: hoohoo.ncsa.uiuc.edu at the Wayback Machine (archived 1997-12-10)

NCSA HTTPd is a discontinued web server originally developed at the NCSA at the University of Illinois at Urbana–Champaign by Robert McCool and others. First released in 1993, it was among the earliest web servers developed, following Tim Berners-Lee's CERN httpd, Tony Sanders' Plexus server, and some others. It was for some time the server counterpart to NCSA Mosaic. It also introduced the Common Gateway Interface, allowing for the creation of dynamic websites.

After Robert McCool left NCSA in mid-1994, the development of NCSA HTTPd slowed greatly. An independent effort, the Apache project, took the codebase and continued; meanwhile, NCSA released one more version (1.5), then ceased development. In August 1995, NCSA HTTPd powered most of all web servers on the Internet; nearly all of them quickly switched over to Apache. By April 1996, Apache passed NCSA HTTPd as the No. 1 server on the Internet, and retained that position until mid-to-late 2016.

== See also ==
- Comparison of web server software
- National Center for Supercomputing Applications
