= Asynchronous Server Gateway Interface =

Calling convention for web servers

ASGI Specification
- Version: 3.0
- Developer: ASGI Team
- Release date: 2019-03-04
- Website: asgi.readthedocs.io/en/latest/specs/index.html
- License: Public domain
- Status: Draft

The Asynchronous Server Gateway Interface (ASGI) is a calling convention for web servers to forward requests to asynchronous-capable Python frameworks, and applications. It is built as a successor to the Web Server Gateway Interface (WSGI).

Where WSGI provided a standard for synchronous Python applications, ASGI provides one for both asynchronous and synchronous applications, with a WSGI backwards-compatibility implementation and multiple servers and application frameworks.

== Example ==
An ASGI-compatible "Hello, World!" application written in Python:

async def application(scope, receive, send):
    event = await receive()
    ...
    await send({"type": "websocket.send", ...})

Where:

- Line 1 defines an asynchronous function named application, which takes three parameters (unlike in WSGI which takes only two), scope, receive and send.
  - scope is a dict containing details about current connection, like the protocol, headers, etc.
  - receive and send are asynchronous callables which let the application receive and send messages from/to the client.
- Line 2 receives an incoming event, for example, HTTP request or WebSocket message. The await keyword is used because the operation is asynchronous.
- Line 4 asynchronously sends a response back to the client. In this case, it is a WebSocket communication.

== Web Server Gateway Interface (WSGI) compatibility ==
ASGI is also designed to be a superset of WSGI, and there's a defined way of translating between the two, allowing WSGI applications to be run inside ASGI servers through a translation wrapper (provided in the asgiref library). A threadpool can be used to run the synchronous WSGI applications away from the async event loop.

== See also ==
- Comparison of web frameworks
- FastCGI
- Python (programming language)
- Web Server Gateway Interface (WSGI)
