= Gunicorn =

Python web server

- Original author: Benoit Chesneau
- Developer: Gunicorn Developers
- Release: 20 February 2010; 16 years ago
- Stable release: 26.2.2 / 6 September 2026; 2 months ago
- Written in: Python
- Operating system: Cross-platform
- Type: Web server
- License: MIT License
- Website: gunicorn.org
- Repository: github.com/benoitc/gunicorn

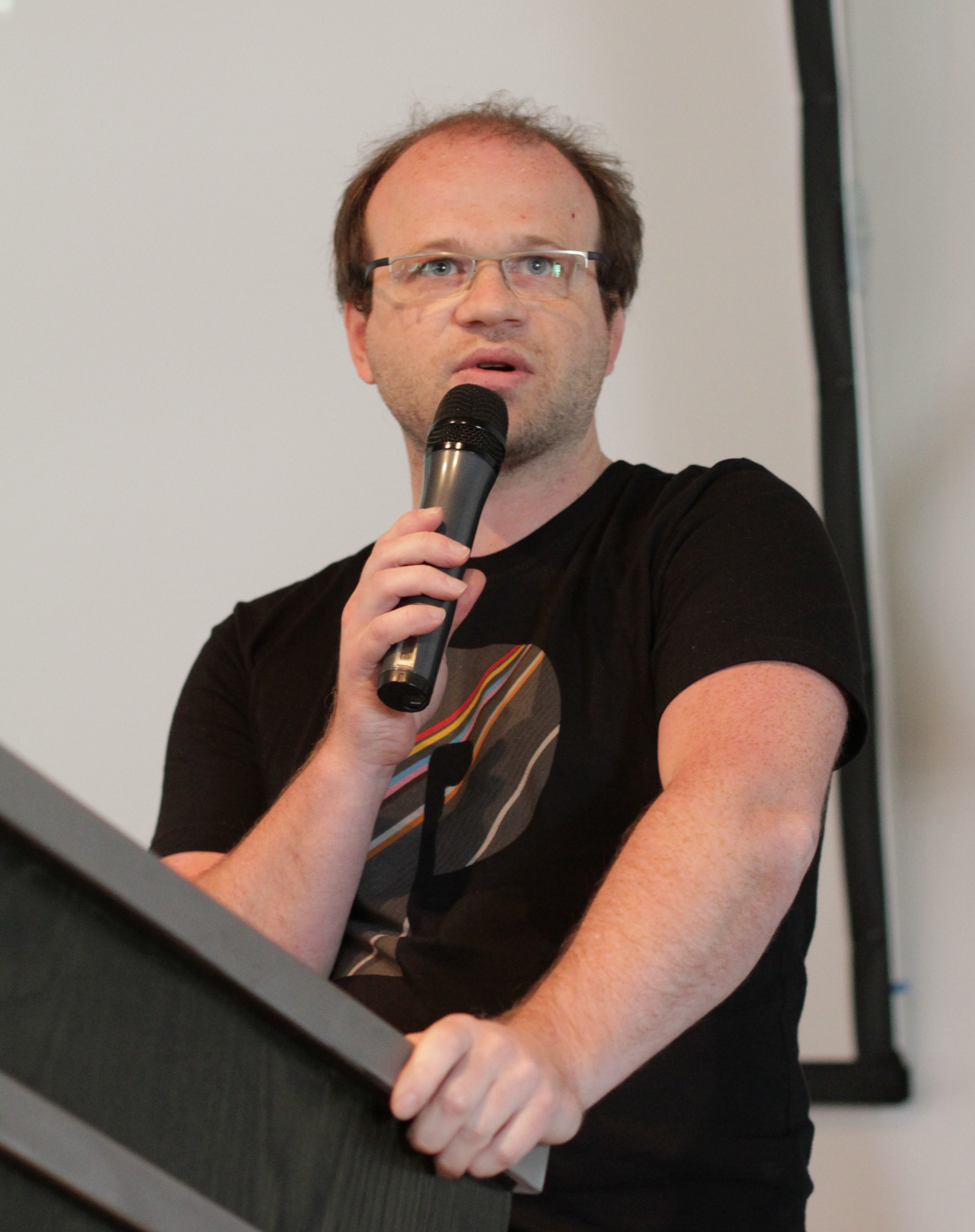
Benoit Chesneau, author of Gunicorn

The Gunicorn "Green Unicorn" (pronounced jee-unicorn or gun-i-corn) is a Python Web Server Gateway Interface (WSGI) HTTP server. It is a pre-fork worker model, ported from Ruby's Unicorn project. The Gunicorn server is broadly compatible with a number of web frameworks, simply implemented, light on server resources and fairly fast. It is often paired with nginx, as the two have complementary features.

== Architecture ==
Server model

- Central master process to manage the workers
- Requests are handled by worker processes
- Components:
  - Master
  - Sync workers
  - Async workers
  - Tornado workers
  - AsyncIO workers

== Features ==
- Natively supports WSGI, web2py, Django and Paster
- Automatic worker process management
- Simple Python configuration
- Multiple worker configurations
- Various server hooks for extensibility
- Compatible with Python 2.6+ and Python 3.2+

== See also ==
- Comparison of web server software
- Comparison of application servers
