= Phusion Passenger =

Open-source web server software

- Developer(s): Phusion
- Stable release: 6.0.26 / 19 February 2025; 36 days ago
- Repository: github.com/phusion/passenger
- Written in: C++ and Ruby
- License: MIT License
- Website: www.phusionpassenger.com

Phusion Passenger (informally also known as mod_rails and mod_rack among the Ruby community) is a free web server and application server with support for Ruby, Python and Node.js. It is designed to integrate into the Apache HTTP Server or the nginx web server, but also has a mode for running standalone without an external web server. Phusion Passenger supports Unix-like operating systems, and is available as a gem package, as a tarball, or as native Linux packages.

Originally designed for web applications built on the Ruby on Rails framework, it was later extended to support arbitrary Ruby web frameworks through the Rack interface. Later versions also added support for Python through the WSGI interface, as well as support for Node.js. In 2012, Phusion announced Phusion Passenger Enterprise, a paid, commercial variant of Phusion Passenger with "a wide array of premium features". Phusion has stated that the open source variant will continue to be developed and maintained along with the Enterprise variant.

Phusion Passenger was the "preferred deployment setup" for Ruby on Rails applications in 2016, and has been recommended by the Ruby on Rails authors in 2009. In 2013, in combination with Ruby 2.0, or with the now-discontinued Ruby Enterprise Edition, Phusion Passenger claimed that it was capable of reducing Rails's memory consumption by 33% as well as increasing its performance.

== Market share ==
As of Aug 2021 more than 130,000 web sites use Phusion Passenger.

== See also ==
- mod_ruby
- List of application servers § Ruby
