= Robert McCool =

Software developer and architect

- Born: 1973 (age 52–53)
- Education: University of Illinois at Urbana–Champaign
- Employers: NCSA; Netscape; Geocast Network Systems; Alpiri; Stanford University; Yahoo!; OnLive; Google
- Known for: NCSA HTTPd; CGI; NSAPI; Apache HTTP Server
- Awards: IMSA 2007 Alumni Trailblazer
- Website: www-ksl.stanford.edu/people/robm/

Robert Martin McCool (born 1973), more commonly known as Rob McCool, is a software developer and architect.

McCool was the author of the original NCSA HTTPd web server, later known as the Apache HTTP Server, and until Apache version 2.2, httpd.conf files as distributed contain comments signed with his name. He wrote the first version while he was an undergraduate at the University of Illinois at Urbana–Champaign, where he was working with the original NCSA Mosaic team. His twin brother, Mike, also attended the university and would join the Mosaic team to work on a port of the Mosaic software to the Macintosh computer. The brothers received their bachelor's degrees from the university in 1995. They went to high school at the Illinois Mathematics and Science Academy (class of 1991) and Robert was awarded its Alumni Trailblazer Award at its inaugural award event during its 20th anniversary celebration on April 20, 2007.

One of Robert McCool's many contributions was in drafting the initial specification of the Common Gateway Interface (CGI), in collaboration with others on the www-talk mailing list, and providing a reference implementation of CGI in version 1.0 of the NCSA HTTPd web server. The CGI specification, introduced in December 1993, turned out to be a key element in making the World Wide Web dynamic and interactive.

McCool was an early Netscape employee, contributing to Netscape Enterprise Server (e.g., NSAPI) and other server-side systems.

Later, at Stanford University, he co-authored the TAP and KDD systems for automatic augmentation of human-generated web content. He is also the author of various journal and conference articles pertaining to semantic search, semantic web, and knowledge provenance.

McCool lives in Menlo Park, California.
