= Hessian (Web service protocol) =

- Developer(s): Caucho Technology, Inc
- Written in: Java, Python and ActionScript
- Operating system: Cross-platform
- Type: Web service protocol
- License: Apache License 2.0
- Website: hessian.caucho.com

Hessian is a binary Web service protocol that makes Web services usable without requiring a large framework, and without learning a new set of protocols. Because it is a binary protocol, it is well-suited to sending binary data without any need to extend the protocol with attachments.

Hessian was developed by Caucho Technology, Inc. The company has released Java, Python and ActionScript for Adobe Flash implementations of Hessian under an open source license (the Apache license). Third-party implementations in several other languages (C++, C#, JavaScript, Perl, PHP, Ruby, Objective-C, D, and Erlang) are also available as open-source.

== Adaptations ==
Although Hessian is primarily intended for Web services, it can be adapted for TCP traffic by using the HessianInput and HessianOutput classes in Caucho's Java implementation.

== Implementations ==
- Cotton (Erlang)
- HessDroid (Android)
- Hessian (on Rubyforge) (Ruby)
- Hessian.js (JavaScript)
- Hessian4J (Java)
- HessianC# (C#)
- HessianCPP (C++)
- HessianD (D)
- HessianKit (Objective-C 2.0)
- HessianObjC (Objective-C)
- HessianPHP (PHP)
- HessianPy (Python)
- HessianRuby (Ruby)
- Hessian-Translator (Perl)

== See also ==
- Abstract Syntax Notation One
- SDXF
- Apache Thrift
- Etch (protocol)
- Protocol Buffers
- Internet Communications Engine
