= Oracle iPlanet Web Proxy Server =

- Original author(s): Sun Microsystems
- Developer(s): Oracle Corporation
- Stable release: 4.0.20 (latest patch 4.0.28)
- Operating system: Solaris; Linux; HPUX; Windows
- Type: proxy server
- Website: Oracle iPlanet WPS page

The Oracle iPlanet Web Proxy Server (OiWPS), formerly known as Sun Java System Web Proxy Server (SJSWPS), is a proxy server software developed by Sun Microsystems (since 2010, Oracle Corporation).

== Overview ==
The Oracle iPlanet Web Proxy Server, is a popular HTTP/1.1 Proxy server software developed by Sun Microsystems. OiWPS 4.0 is widely used for proxying, caching, and filtering web content, boosting network security and performance, as well as to protect and secure, and load balance across, content servers.

== History ==
Earlier known as Sun ONE Web Proxy server, the Sun Java System Web Proxy Server 4.0 is a major rewrite of the older 3.x version of Sun's Proxy server, formerly known as Netscape Proxy Server.

The Netscape Proxy Server version 3.x was essentially a coupling between the Netscape browser client, responsible for talking to remote servers, and the Netscape web server 4.x, which in turn handled the duty of talking to a client. Support for multithreading was absent, and the Proxy server operated in multi-process mode where each request was handled by a dedicated process.

Sun Java System Web Proxy server 4.0 resulted from a major rewrite of Netscape Proxy Server in 2003–2004, when Sun decided to reinvest in Proxy technology. Switching to Sun web server 6.1's core architecture brought in support for multi-threading while still allowing users to configure the server for multiple processes when so desired. A brand new http client, admin and installer GUI, and localization were the other major changes involved. 4.0 retained other significant features of 3.x such as the ftp client, gopher client, connect client, batch updates, and so on.

After acquisition of Sun Microsystems by Oracle Corporation in 2010, Sun Java System Web Proxy Server 4.0 was rebranded as Oracle iPlanet Web Proxy Server 4.0.

== Features ==
Multithreaded core
Optional support for a Multi-process architecture
The following protocol clients are available:

HTTP (1.1 & 1.0)
FTP
Gopher
CONNECT (SSL Tunneling)

CARP

ICP

Batch updates ('Prefetch' or 'data refresh')

SSL support for secure access

Routing / Load balancing
URL Filtering

SOCKS v5 support

GUI-based Administration interface for server management, monitoring and migration

GUI-based Installer

Distributed Administration

SNMP for Server monitoring

LDAP support for centralized authentication management

Netscape Server Application Programming Interface for customization
Multilevel logging with support for log rotation, log monitoring and analysis
Internet Content Adaptation Protocol (ICAP)

Note1: Officially unsupported
Note2: Undocumented
Note3: Disabled by default 

=== Recently added features ===
Internal DNS lookup client
Support for (Squid-like) PURGE requests
SED filter for HTTP request/response body rewriting
In-memory cache for frequently used cache files
'URL Mapping'
Telemetry / Service Tags support
Support for stale-while-revalidate cache-control extension (RFC 5861)

=== Supported Platforms ===
Currently supported platforms:

Oracle Solaris 10 for SPARC and x86
Red Hat Enterprise Linux Advanced Server 4
Red Hat Enterprise Linux Advanced Server 5
Oracle Linux 4
Oracle Linux 5
SUSE Linux Enterprise Server 10
Microsoft Windows Server 2003
Microsoft Windows Server 2003 R2
Microsoft Windows Server 2008

Version 4.0.16 deprecated support for the following platforms:

Sun Solaris 8 for SPARC
Sun Solaris 9 for SPARC and x86
HP-UX 11i (11.11)
Red Hat Enterprise Linux Advanced Server 3
Microsoft Windows 2000 Server
Microsoft Windows 2000 Advanced Server

=== Product updates as Oracle iPlanet Web Proxy Server ===
4.0.14 was the first release with Oracle-specific rebranding changes.

As of October 2016:

4.0.20 is the latest stable version suitable for new installations.

4.0.27 is the latest patch available.

Oracle iPlanet Web Proxy Server 4.0 now supports the following new features:

Support for Proxying of NTLM sessions
Enhanced platform support, including SUSE Linux
Include file capability in server's obj.conf
Routing-related admin GUI enhancements
Miscellaneous performance enhancements
Improved HTTP compliance
Cookie rewriting features in updated "URL Mapping" functionality
date/time parameter support in <Client> tags
Miscellaneous GUI enhancements for server monitoring, ACL subsystem, etc.
Updated NSS/NSPR
Multiple new configuration parameters for http client's channel handling

More information on new features, platforms support, and resolved issues can be found in the product release notes

=== ICAP Support ===
While Oracle iPlanet Proxy Server 4.0.17 does not provide official Internet Content Adaptation Protocol (ICAP) support yet, version 4.0.17 is capable of talking to ICAP servers.

Official support may be added in a future release, subject to market demand and business justification.

== See also ==
- Oracle Technology Network
- Oracle Fusion Middleware
- Oracle iPlanet Web Server
