= Mod deflate =

mod_deflate is an optional module for the Apache HTTP Server, Apache v2.0 and later. It is based on Deflate lossless data compression algorithm that uses a combination of the LZ77 algorithm and Huffman coding. This module provides the DEFLATE output filter that allows output from Apache HTTP server to be compressed before being sent to the client over the network. It also provides a filter for decompressing (inflating, uncompressing) a gzip compressed response body.

== Limitation ==
The mod_deflate module does not have a lower bound for file size, so it attempts to compress files that are too small to benefit from compression. This results in files smaller than approximately 120 bytes becoming larger when processed by mod_deflate.

== Compatibility ==
You can check a server to see if it is sending out compressed data, and compression compatibility of your browser for example here.

When textual content compressed using mod_gzip, it should maintain its MIME-type, according to their recommended media type:

- HTML: text/html
- XHTML: application/xhtml+xml
- CSS: text/css
- JavaScript: application/x-javascript

== Alternatives ==
The mod_gzip module is similar to mod_deflate, for Apache v1 and v2.

A mod_gz module was independently developed by Ian Holsman. This module implements a gzip compression filter for Apache 2.0, providing similar functionality to mod_gzip. One important difference between the two modules is that mod_gzip includes its own gzip implementation, whereas mod_gz relies on an external zlib library.

In PHP, a similar effect is achievable for the output of PHP scripts with:

- the ob_gzhandler() and the gzencode() functions;
- zlib.output_compression option in the php.ini file.

CherryPy offers the Gzip filter, which uses the zlib module of Python standard library.

== License ==
The mod_deflate module is part of Apache v2, licensed with Apache License 2.0.

== History ==
Module level content compression for Apache started with mod_gzip, which is an external extension module, since Apache 1.3.

The developers of the Apache 2.0.x servers have included mod_deflate in the codebase for the server to perform a similar GZIP-encoding function. Early versions provided lesser amount of compression than mod_gzip.

Starting with Apache 2.0.45, the compression level of mod_deflate is configurable using the DeflateCompressionLevel directive. This directive accepts values between 1 (fastest compression speed, lowest compression ratio) and 9 (slowest compression speed, highest compression ratio), with the default value being 6. This change made the compression in mod_deflate comparable to mod_gzip out of the box.

== See also ==
- HTTP compression
- Some general purpose Apache modules
- Some programming language interfaces for Apache
