= Sun Java System =

Sun Java System was a brand used by Sun Microsystems to market computer software. The Sun Java System brand superseded the Sun ONE brand in September 2003. There are two major suites under this brand, the Sun Java Enterprise System suite of infrastructure software, and the Sun Java Desktop System graphical user environment.

== Sun ONE brand ==
Sun ONE was a brand under which Sun Microsystems marketed server software products from 2002 to 2003. Sun ONE stood for Sun Open Net Environment.

The Sun ONE brand was primarily used for products that resulted after the dissolution of Sun's alliance with Netscape Communications Corporation, which was sold under the brand name of iPlanet. The name was also applied to other Sun software products such as Sun ONE Studio 8 and Sun ONE Active Server Pages 4.0. Products included:

- Sun ONE Web Server
- Sun ONE Web Proxy Server
- Sun ONE Application Server
- Sun ONE Messaging Server
- Sun ONE Calendar Server
- Sun ONE Directory Server

Sun ONE was introduced on April 15, 2002, to supersede the iPlanet brand name, following the end of the Sun-Netscape alliance. Sun ONE itself was superseded on September 16, 2003, by the Sun Java System brand.

== Sun Java Enterprise System ==
The Sun Java Enterprise System is itself broken into smaller suites, which include:

=== Identity management services (Sun Java Identity Management Suite) ===
- Sun Java System Access Manager
- Sun Java System Identity Manager
- Sun Java System Role Manager
- Sun Java System Federation Manager
- Sun Java System Directory Server, formerly Sun ONE Directory Server and iPlanet Directory Server
- Sun Java System Directory Proxy Server

=== Business Integration - SOA (Sun Java Composite Application Platform Suite) ===
- Sun Java ESB Suite
- Sun Java B2B Suite

=== Web and application services ===
- Sun Java System Application Server (SJSAS), formerly Sun ONE Application Server
- Sun Java System Message Queue (SJSMQ), formerly Java Message Queue
- Sun Java System Web Server, formerly Sun ONE Web Server and iPlanet Web Server
- Sun Java System Web Proxy Server, formerly Sun ONE Web Proxy Server and iPlanet Web Proxy Server
- Sun Java System Messaging Server, formerly Sun ONE Messaging Server and iPlanet Messaging Server
- Sun Java System Calendar Server, formerly Sun ONE Calendar Server and iPlanet Calendar Server
- Sun Java System Service Registry

=== Portal services ===
- Sun Java System Portal Server
- Sun Java System Portal Mobile Access
- Sun Java System Portal Remote Access

=== Availability services (Sun Java Availability Suite) ===
- Sun Cluster
- Sun Cluster Agents
- Sun Cluster Geographic Edition
- Sun N1 Service Provisioning System

=== Development tools ===
- Java Studio Enterprise
- Java Studio Creator
