= Caucho Technology =

Caucho Technology, Inc.
- Type: Private
- Industry: Technology
- Founded: 1998; 28 years ago
- Headquarters: San Diego, CA
- Key people: Steve Montal (CEO)
- Products: Web server, Application server
- Website: caucho.com

Caucho Technology is based in San Diego, CA. It is an information technology company that produces web server software and application server software as well as the originators of Quercus and Hessian open source projects. Caucho Technology was founded in 1998.

== Products ==
The Resin server project was started in 1997. The first version was released in 1998. Resin is both a web server and an application server. Resin is dual licensed as GPL and commercial.

Quercus, an open source standalone project that is part of Resin, is a PHP clone written in Java with speeds that exceed standard PHP.

Hessian, another open source project from Caucho, is a binary web service protocol similar in concept to Google protocol buffers and BSON but predating them by almost a decade.

Resin Server, Caucho's flagship product, was mentioned in the February 2012 Netcraft report as growing by a factor of ten in 2011.

== Chronology ==
- 2018: Caucho celebrates 20 Year Anniversary
- 2018: Korea Chamber of Commerce & Industry achieves nationwide scalability using Resin clustering
- 2018: Resin Embedded adds support for Spring Boot command line deployment
- 2017: Caucho partners with the NTT Data Intramart Figtree Innovation Centre in Sydney to develop performance, cloud and security services
- 2017: Caucho presents Baratine Microservices at Devoxx 2017 Conference
- 2017: Caucho expands South Korean market through partnership with Xest Information Technology. Customers include Samsung, Ministry of National Defense and Korea Coast Guard
- 2017: NTT Data Intramart achieves 5,500 customer sales — powered by Resin
- 2016: Caucho introduces ultra fast and single-threaded Baratine GPL microservices framework
- 2016: Mitsubishi Corporation, Toyota Administration Corporation and Namco Bandai Holdings Inc. run on Resin as part of Caucho's partnership with NTT Data Intramart
- 2015: Caucho expands reseller and OEM program throughout Southeast Asia, Russia, India and the Middle East
- 2014: Caucho begins work on Baratine, a new distributed in-memory Java service platform
- 2013: Caucho celebrates 15-year anniversary!
- 2012: Netcraft reports 4.7 million sites deployed on Resin
- 2011: Caucho named “Cool Vendor” and “Visionary” by Gartner
- 2011: Resin Pro Cloud Optimized and Web Profile certified
- 2010: Resin leads Web Profile technology and keynotes TheServerSide Java Symposium
- 2009: Significant Cloud Support and Administration feature enhancements
- 2008: Introduction of Resin 3rd generation clustering and CDI
- 2007: Resin 3.1 released
- 2006: Japan's largest online gaming portal deploys on Resin
- 2006: Caucho releases Quercus, a PHP-Java implemented in 100% Java
- 2005: Caucho becomes a Sun Microsystem J2EE licensee
- 2004: Hessian 1.0 spec released
- 2003: e-gatematrix deploys on Resin
- 2002: CNET deploys on Resin
- 2001: AltaVista search deploys on Resin
- 2001: Caucho & NTT Data Intramart launch partnership
- 2000: Salesforce deploys on Resin
- 1999: Resin 1.0 released
- 1998: Caucho founded with the goal to provide lightweight and high performance Java services

== See also ==
- Comparison of web server software
- Comparison of lightweight web servers
- Comparison of application servers
