= Web Calendar Access Protocol =

Web Calendar Access Protocol (WCAP) is a protocol for remote client-server calendar access and scheduling based on the XML, HTTP, iCalendar, and vCard Internet standards.

WCAP was created for use with the product that eventually became Sun Java System Calendar Server. WCAP uses simple HTTP GET commands for accessing iCalendar, Freebusy, TODO and vCard entries. WCAP responses are either the traditional text form or an XML form of iCalendar/etc. Several plugins exist including those for Mozilla Thunderbird, Novell Evolution and Microsoft Outlook.

CalDAV is a competing protocol which as of 2007 underwent standardization.

== Example ==
=== Client ===
GET /wcap/get_freebusy.wcap?appid=mozilla-calendar&calid=mailto%3Atom%40localhost&busyonly=1&dtstart=20070521T040000Z&dtend=20070525T040000Z&fmt-out=text%2Fxml&id=17046506 HTTP/1.1
Host: localhost:8080
User-Agent: Mozilla/5.0 (X11; U; Linux i686; en-US; rv:1.8.0.10) Gecko/20070403 Thunderbird/1.5.0.10
Accept: text/xml,application/xml,application/xhtml+xml,text/html;q=0.9,text/plain;q=0.8,image/png,*/*;q=0.5
Accept-Language: en-us,en;q=0.5
Accept-Encoding: gzip, deflate
Accept-Charset: ISO-8859-1,utf-8;q=0.7,*;q=0.7
Keep-Alive: 300
Connection: keep-alive
Pragma: no-cache
Cache-Control: no-cache

=== Response ===
HTTP/1.1 200 OK
Server: Apache-Coyote/1.1
X-Powered-By: Servlet 2.4; JBoss-4.0.4.GA (build: CVSTag=JBoss_4_0_4_GA date=200605151000)/Tomcat-5.5
Set-Cookie: JSESSIONID=41DAC48C79927D68EDFAF5FBFD491236; Path=/
Content-Type: text/html;charset=ISO-8859-1
Content-Length: 1399
Date: Mon, 21 May 2007 19:43:37 GMT

<?xml version="1.0" encoding="UTF-8"?>
<iCalendar>
<iCal version="2.0" prodid="-//Buni Meldware Calendar Server 0.8//EN" METHOD="PUBLISH">
<X-NSCP-CALPROPS-LAST-MODIFIED>20061102T170639Z</X-NSCP-CALPROPS-LAST-MODIFIED>
<X-NSCP-CALPROPS-CREATED>20060814T110002Z</X-NSCP-CALPROPS-CREATED>
<X-NSCP-CALPROPS-READ>999</X-NSCP-CALPROPS-READ>
<X-NSCP-CALPROPS-WRITE>999</X-NSCP-CALPROPS-WRITE>
<X-NSCP-CALPROPS-RELATIVE-CALID>tom</X-NSCP-CALPROPS-RELATIVE-CALID>
<X-NSCP-CALPROPS-NAME>tom</X-NSCP-CALPROPS-NAME>
<X-NSCP-CALPROPS-PRIMARY-OWNER>tom</X-NSCP-CALPROPS-PRIMARY-OWNER>
<X-NSCP-CALPROPS-ACCESS-CONTROL-ENTRY>@@o^c^WDEIC^g</X-NSCP-CALPROPS-ACCESS-CONTROL-ENTRY>
<X-NSCP-CALPROPS-ACCESS-CONTROL-ENTRY>@@o^a^RSF^g</X-NSCP-CALPROPS-ACCESS-CONTROL-ENTRY>
<X-NSCP-CALPROPS-ACCESS-CONTROL-ENTRY>@^a^rsf^g</X-NSCP-CALPROPS-ACCESS-CONTROL-ENTRY>
<X-NSCP-CALPROPS-ACCESS-CONTROL-ENTRY>@^c^^g</X-NSCP-CALPROPS-ACCESS-CONTROL-ENTRY>
<X-NSCP-CALPROPS-ACCESS-CONTROL-ENTRY>@^p^r^g</X-NSCP-CALPROPS-ACCESS-CONTROL-ENTRY>
<X-NSCP-CALPROPS-RESOURCE>0</X-NSCP-CALPROPS-RESOURCE>
<X-S1CS-CALPROPS-ALLOW-DOUBLEBOOKING>1</X-S1CS-CALPROPS-ALLOW-DOUBLEBOOKING>
<FREEBUSY>
<START>20070521T040000Z</START>
<END>20070525T040000Z</END>
<FB FBTYPE="BUSY">20070521T130000Z/20070521T140000Z</FB><FB FBTYPE="BUSY">20070521T150000Z/20070521T160000Z</FB>
</FREEBUSY>
<X-NSCP-WCAP-ERRNO>0</X-NSCP-WCAP-ERRNO>
</iCal>
</iCalendar>
