= MaxMind =

Company that provides location data for IP addresses

MaxMind, Inc.
- Type: Private
- Industry: Internet geolocation, risk management, fraud prevention
- Founded: 2002; 24 years ago
- Founder: Thomas Mather
- Headquarters: Malden, Massachusetts, U.S.
- Website: www.maxmind.com

MaxMind, Inc. is a Massachusetts-based data company that provides location data for IP addresses and other data for IP addresses, and fraud detection data.

== History ==
MaxMind was founded in 2002 by Thomas "TJ" Mather and is based in Malden, Massachusetts, United States. The company sells IP geolocation and other IP address related data under the GeoIP brand. In 2004, MaxMind began offering the minFraud service, a transactional risk analysis service.

=== Kansas glitch ===
In an unusual technical glitch, a farmstead about 4 miles (6.4 km) northeast of Potwin, Kansas became the default physical address associated by MaxMind with over 600 million addresses, because the digital mapping company changed the putative geographic center of the contiguous United States from 39°50′N 98°35′W to 38°N 97°W. The IP addresses were frequently used by suspected criminals and other nefarious actors, which would subsequently be mapped to the Kansas farm from MaxMind's data. Law enforcement and other individuals frequently contacted or visited the property owners in connection with acts linked to the IP addresses. The owners of the property at those coordinates filed a lawsuit against MaxMind. MaxMind moved the geographic location of the default IP address to the middle of a Kansas lake and settled the case via alternative dispute resolution in September 2017.
