= Resin (software) =

- Developer: Caucho Technology
- Stable release: 4.0.67 / 20 November 2024; 18 months ago
- Written in: Java and C
- Operating system: Cross-platform
- Type: Web server
- License: GPLv3 or Proprietary
- Website: caucho.com

Resin is a web server and Java application server developed by Caucho Technology. Currently, only two versions are available: Resin (GPL), which is free for production use, and Resin Pro, designed for enterprise and production environments with a licensing fee. Resin supports the Java EE standard and features a mod_php/PHP-like engine called Quercus.

Resin (GPL) offers essential functionalities for web and application serving, while Resin Pro includes additional optimizations, such as:

- Built-in Caching: Resin Pro incorporates built-in caching mechanisms to improve performance.
- Clustering: Resin Pro supports public, private, or hybrid clustering, enhancing scalability and redundancy.
- Advanced Administration and Health System: It provides an advanced administration system and health monitoring for efficient server management.
- HTTP Session Replication: Ensures high availability by replicating HTTP sessions across multiple server instances.
- Distributed Cache Replication: Enhances application performance by replicating cached data across a distributed environment.
- Auto-Recovery and Diagnostic Reports: Resin Pro offers automatic recovery mechanisms and detailed diagnostic reports to help troubleshoot.

Resin is primarily written in Java, with parts in C.

== Product features ==
Resin Pro has been engineered to include:

- Dynamic Clustering: Locking was replaced with non-locking atomic operations, clearing contention bottlenecks, improving the async/epoll performance, and reducing thread overhead to handle 100,000 requests per second.
- Cloud Support: A single command can add or remove Elastic cluster members. Cluster topology, load balancing, caching, messaging, and management automatically adapt to dynamic servers.
- Compiled PHP on the JVM: Improves performance, scalability, and security of PHP applications by allowing PHP code to call Java Objects directly.
- Security through OpenSSL integration: A comprehensive security framework for application authentication, authorization, and transport level SSL-based security;
- Smart Software Load balancer: Application load is shared among resources automatically to balance them.
- Proxy cache: Java caching can improve application performance by saving the results of long calculations and reducing database load and application response time

Scalability

- Elastic Clustering / Cloud support
  - 3rd generation clustering optimized for Virtualization 2.0, EC2 and OpenStack deployments
- Session Replication
- Load balancing
- Distributed Cache
  - Memcached wire protocol for Couchbase Server like caching

Development

- Class compilation
- JIT Profiling and heap analysis
- No GUI required
- JUnit support
- Web Admin
- DevOps support via CLI and REST control of Resin
- Apache Ant/Maven/Ivy integration
- IDE integration
- Flexible project management
- Logging

Production Ready

- Reliability
- Server Monitoring
- Deployment / Cloud deployment
- Versioned deployment
- Merge paths
- Troubleshooting aids
- Server health reports, baselining and post mortem reporting
- Throttling

App Server

- Java EE Web Profile certified,
- Java CDI
  - standard Java dependency injection similar to Guice and Spring, part of Java EE
- Transaction support

Web Server

- Static files/JSP/Servlet/JSF
- Extensible access logging
- URL rewriting
- Proxy caching (similar to Squid)
- Gzip compression
- SSL
- Virtual Hosts
- Comet/Server push
- WebSocket
- mod-php like support via Quercus
- FastCGI

== Usage ==
Resin's market share is small in the grand scheme of Java Application Servers, but some high-traffic sites use it, such as the Toronto Stock Exchange, Salesforce.com, Condé Nast (parent company of Wired, Vogue, GQ) and CNET. NetCraft's February 2012 Survey stated Resin grew to 4,700,000 sites; Resin was the only Java-based web server mentioned.

A 2012 page on a Caucho wiki site describes a test procedure, with results showing that Resin tested 0k (empty HTML page), 1K, 8K, and 64K byte files. At every level, Resin matched or exceeded Nginx web server performance.

== Quercus ==
Quercus is a Java-based implementation of the PHP language included with Resin. According to a slideshow presented by Emil Ong (from Caucho) to a San Francisco Java Meetup Group in April 2008 pertaining to Resin 3.1, an essential difference in the operation of Quercus between the Resin Open Source and the Resin Professional editions is that in Resin Professional, the PHP is compiled to Java bytecode. In contrast, in the open-source version, PHP is executed by an interpreter.

Caucho stated in 2007 that Quercus was faster than standard PHP 5 (PHP 8 with JIT is much faster than older PHP versions; PHP 5 is no longer supported), although this is only true for the JIT-compiled version in Resin Professional. Quercus ships with Resin.

== Licensing ==
One license covers all components of the Resin architecture.

Resin is provided in both an open-source GPL license and a Pro version with enhancements for enterprises.

== See also ==
- Comparison of application servers
