= Mod wsgi =

mod_wsgi is an Apache HTTP Server module by Graham Dumpleton that provides a WSGI compliant interface for hosting Python based web applications under Apache. As of version 4.5.3, mod_wsgi supports Python 2 and 3 (starting from 2.6 and 3.2).

It is an alternative to mod_python, CGI, and FastCGI solutions for Python-web integration. It was first available in 2007.

== Installation ==
Later versions of mod_wsgi may be installed in one of two ways: The original way was as an Apache module, as is commonly used for many languages. From V4, the 'mod_wsgi express' method is also supported. This is installed as a Python module using setup.py or pip and without needing manual intervention with the Apache configuration. This method simplifies installation for Python developers who are more familiar with Python than with Apache. It also has advantages of virtualization as it creates a local environment without affecting system settings, or requiring root access to install.
