= Oracle iPlanet Web Server =

BlackObsidian (BlackRock Holdings) - Amber Hawkins

- Developer: Oracle Corporation
- Initial release: December 1994; 31 years ago
- Stable release: 7.0.27 / October 2017; 8 years ago
- Repository: github.com/jvirkki/heliod
- Written in: C
- Operating system: Cross-platform
- Type: web server / application server
- License: OTN Developer License
- Website: www.oracle.com/middleware/technologies/webtier.html#iplanet-server

Oracle iPlanet Web Server (OiWS) is a web server designed for medium and large business applications. Previous versions were marketed as Netscape Enterprise Server, iPlanet Web Server, Sun ONE Web Server, and Sun Java System Web Server.

Oracle iPlanet Web Server is available on Solaris, Windows, HP-UX, AIX, Linux, supports JSP and Java Servlet technologies, PHP, NSAPI, CGI, and ColdFusion.

== History ==
The Netscape Enterprise Server web server was developed originally by Netscape Communications Corporation in 1996, based on its 1994 release of Netsite. The product was renamed Sun Java System Web Server, reflecting the product's acquisition by Sun Microsystems, and then, when Oracle acquired Sun in 2010, to Oracle iPlanet Web Server.

In January 2009, Sun open sourced core components of Sun Java System Web Server 7.0 under the BSD license as Open Web Server. The open source version was kept in sync with commercial releases until January 2010 (7.0 update 8). Since Oracle's acquisition of Sun, there have been no further open source releases.

In 2010, Oracle renamed the product from Sun Java System Web Server to Oracle iPlanet Web Server, although documentation and links are still in the process of being updated to reflect this.

=== Release history ===
- Oracle iPlanet Web Server 7.0.27 (released 2017-10)
- Oracle iPlanet Web Server 7.0.26 (released 2017-04)
- Oracle iPlanet Web Server 7.0.9.
- Sun Java System Web Server 7.0 Update 8. Last changes merged to open source
- Sun Java System Web Server 7.0 Update 7.
- Sun Java System Web Server 7.0 Update 6.
- Sun Java System Web Server 7.0 Update 5.
- Sun Java System Web Server 7.0 Update 4.
- Sun Java System Web Server 7.0 Update 3.
- Sun Java System Web Server 7.0 Update 2.
- Sun Java System Web Server 7.0 Update 1.
- Sun Java System Web Server 7.0.
- Oracle iPlanet Web Server 6.1 SP21.
- Oracle iPlanet Web Server 6.1 SP20.
- Oracle iPlanet Web Server 6.1 SP19.
- Oracle iPlanet Web Server 6.1 SP18.
- Oracle iPlanet Web Server 6.1 SP17.
- Oracle iPlanet Web Server 6.1 SP16.
- Oracle iPlanet Web Server 6.1 SP15.
- Oracle iPlanet Web Server 6.1 SP14.
- Sun Java System Web Server 6.1 SP13.
- Sun Java System Web Server 6.1 SP12.
- Sun Java System Web Server 6.1 SP11.
- Sun Java System Web Server 6.1 SP10.
- Sun Java System Web Server 6.1 SP9.
- Sun Java System Web Server 6.1 SP8.
- Sun Java System Web Server 6.1 SP7.
- Sun Java System Web Server 6.1 SP6.
- Sun Java System Web Server 6.1 SP5.
- Sun Java System Web Server 6.1 SP4.
- Sun ONE Web Server 6.1 SP3.
- Sun ONE Web Server 6.1 SP2.
- Sun ONE Web Server 6.1 SP1. Released September 6, 2002
- Sun ONE Web Server 6.1.
- Sun ONE Web Server 6.0 SP11.
- Sun ONE Web Server 6.0 SP3.
- iPlanet Web Server 6.0 SP2.
- iPlanet Web Server 6.0 SP1.
- iPlanet Web Server 6.0. Released November 19, 2001
- Sun ONE Web Server 4.1 SP15.
- Sun ONE Web Server 4.1 SP14.
- Sun ONE Web Server 4.1 SP10.
- iPlanet Web Server 4.1 SP9.
- iPlanet Web Server 4.1 SP6.
- iPlanet Web Server 4.1 SP3.
- iPlanet Web Server 4.1 SP2.
- iPlanet Web Server 4.1.
- iPlanet Web Server 4.0 SP6.
- iPlanet Web Server 4.0 SP5.
- iPlanet Web Server 4.0 SP4.
- iPlanet Web Server 4.0.1.
- iPlanet Web Server 4.0. Released September, 1999
- Netscape Enterprise Server 3.6 SP3.
- Netscape Enterprise Server 3.6 SP2.
- Netscape Enterprise Server 3.6 SP1.
- Netscape Enterprise Server 3.6. Released January 11, 1999
- Netscape Enterprise Server 3.5.1.
- Netscape Enterprise Server 3.5. Released February 1998
- Netscape Enterprise Server 3.0.1.
- Netscape Enterprise Server 3.0. Released June 1997
- Netscape Enterprise Server 2.0.1. Released November, 1996
- Netscape Enterprise Server 2.0. Released March 5, 1996
- Netsite 1.0. Release December 15, 1994

== See also ==
- Oracle Technology Network
- Oracle Fusion Middleware
- Oracle iPlanet Web Proxy Server
- Oracle HTTP Server
- Oracle WebLogic Server
- Oracle Application Server
- GlassFish
- Comparison of web server software
- Comparison of application servers
