= Nick Bradbury =

American software developer

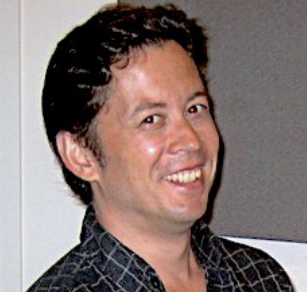
- Nick Bradbury, 2006
- Born: May 11, 1967 (age 59)
- Known for: HomeSite; TopStyle; FeedDemon

Nick Bradbury (born May 11, 1967) is an American software developer and entrepreneur. Bradbury is noted for creating the early web-development editors HomeSite and TopStyle, and FeedDemon, the RSS news aggregator for Microsoft Windows. Currently, he is a mobile developer at the software company Automattic. He is a graduate of the University of Tennessee, Knoxville and currently resides in Knoxville, Tennessee.

== HomeSite ==
Bradbury developed HomeSite in 1995 as a tool for direct editing, or "hand coding," of HTML and other website languages. HomeSite was acquired by Allaire Corporation in March 1997. Bradbury left Allaire in 1998. HomeSite was later acquired by Macromedia in 2001. Macromedia was acquired by Adobe Systems in 2005.

== TopStyle and FeedDemon ==
After Bradbury left Allaire in 1998, he began work on creation of TopStyle, a CSS/XHTML/HTML editor and on FeedDemon, an RSS news aggregator. Both programs operated on the Microsoft Windows operating system. TopStyle and FeedDemon were purchased by NewsGator Technologies in May 2005. In 2008, TopStyle was acquired by Stephan Van As and is still available as TopStyle 5.

== See also ==
- HomeSite
- FeedDemon
