= Li Fan =

Li Fan may refer to:

- Li Fan (Han dynasty) (c. 1st century), Han dynasty astronomer
- Li Fan (Tang dynasty) (754–811), Tang dynasty chancellor
- Li Fan (crater), impact crater on Mars, named after the astronomer
- Li Fan (Prince of Qi), son of Emperor Ruizong of Tang, born Li Longfan
- Li Shu Fan (1887–1966), member of the Legislative Council of Hong Kong
- Li Fan (engineer), computer scientist
