= Series A round =

First significant round of venture financing

A series A is the name typically given to a company's first significant round of venture capital financing. It can be followed by the word round, investment or financing. The name refers to the class of preferred stock sold to investors in exchange for their investment. It is usually the first series of stock after the common stock and common stock options issued to company founders, employees, friends and family and angel investors.

Series A rounds are traditionally a critical stage in the funding of new companies. Series A investors typically purchase 10% to 30% of the company. The capital raised during a series A is usually intended to capitalize the company for 6 months to 2 years as it develops its products, performs initial marketing and branding, hires its initial employees, and otherwise undertakes early stage business operations.

It may be followed by more rounds (Series B, Series C, etc).

== Sources of capital ==
Because there are no public exchanges listing their securities, private companies meet venture capital firms and other private equity investors in several ways, including warm referrals from the investors' trusted sources and other business contacts; investor conferences and demo days where companies pitch directly to investor groups. As equity crowdfunding becomes more established, startups are increasingly raising their Series A round online using platforms like SeedInvest in the US. These blended rounds include a mix of angel investors, strategic investors and customers alongside the offline venture capital investors.

== Structure ==
Smaller investment amounts are usually not worth the legal and financial expense, the burden on a company of adjusting its capital structure to serve new investors, and the analysis and due diligence on the part of institutional investors. A company that needs money for operations but is not yet ready for venture capital will typically seek angel capital. Larger amounts are usually unwarranted given the cost of business in fields such as software, data services, telecommunications, and so on. However, there are routinely series A rounds in excess of $10 million in fields such as pharmaceuticals, semiconductors, and real estate development. They all share a similar legal and financial framework, but specific terminology, deal terms, and investment practices vary according to business customs within different countries, business sectors, investor communities, and geographical regions.

In the United States, Series A preferred stock is the first round of stock offered during the seed or early stage round by a portfolio company to the venture capital investor. Series A preferred stock is often convertible into common stock in certain cases such as an initial public offering (IPO) or the sale of the company.

Series A rounds in the United States venture capital community, particularly in Silicon Valley, are widely reported in business press, blogs, industry reports, and other media that cover the technology industry. Series A rounds also occur in non-technology industries and receive investment from investment banks, corporate investors, angel investors, public agencies, and others, that receive less press coverage than technology startup funding rounds.

In Britain, Series A equity funding is typically structured by the issuance of preference shares, redeemable shares, redeemable preference shares, ordinary shares (possibly split into different classes, for instance A ordinary shares and B ordinary shares), or some combination thereof.

== See also ==
- Crowdsourcing
- Crowdfunding
- Revenue-based financing
- Securities offering
- Seed money
