= SeedInvest =

American financial technology company

- Industry: Crowdfunding
- Founded: 2012; 14 years ago
- Founders: Ryan Feit, James Han
- Headquarters: New York City, United States
- Area served: United States
- Services: Entrepreneurship, startups, investment
- Owners: Circle Internet Financial Ltd.
- Number of employees: 30+
- Website: www.seedinvest.com

SeedInvest is an equity crowdfunding platform that connects startups with investors online. The company was founded in 2012 and launched in 2013. SeedInvest has focused on building liquidity in the platform by attracting high-net-worth individuals, family offices and venture capital firms. SeedInvest screens and vets deals before allowing them to take advantage of the JOBS Act exemption permitting General Solicitation. In September 2014 the company launched a partnership with Angel Investing website Gust.

In October 2018, SeedInvest was acquired by peer-to-peer payment company Circle Internet Financial Ltd.

In 2023, StartEngine, a U.S.-based equity crowdfunding platform, officially acquired assets of SeedInvest, from Pluto Holdings, LLC, an affiliate of Circle Internet Financial.

== Funding ==
SeedInvest raised a significant portion of its own $4.15 million Series A funding round online in April 2014. It was led by Scout Ventures, a venture capital firm, and a mix of other venture capital and angel investors. An earlier round of seed capital was raised in 2013. In 2020, it has raised a total of $5.1 million. The platform sends start-ups for intensive verification; investors can participate for as little as $500 with a 2% fee. Fees, capped at $300, are refundable if the listing fails to meet its fundraising goal.

== JOBS Act ==
SeedInvest founders Ryan Feit and James Han were involved in consultation with the U.S. Securities and Exchange Commission (SEC) and in the United States Congress for the passing of the JOBS Act. The JOBS Act included provisions that permit online equity crowdfunding by platforms such as SeedInvest. SeedInvest hosted the first Testing The Waters campaign under the new Regulation A rules for equity crowdfunding on June 19, 2015.
