= Circle Internet Group =

Peer-to-peer payments technology company

Circle Internet Group, Inc.
- Company type: Public company
- Website type: B2B fintech platform
- Traded as: NYSE: CRCL (Class A); Russell 1000 component
- Headquarters: New York City, United States
- Area served: International
- Founders: Jeremy Allaire; Sean Neville
- Key people: Jeremy Allaire (CEO & chair); Heath Tarbert (President); Li Fan (Chief Technology and AI Officer); Jeremy Fox-Geen (CFO)
- Products: USDC, EURC, USYC
- Revenue: ▲US$1.7 billion (2024)
- Website: circle.com
- Launched: October 2013; 13 years ago

Circle Internet Group, Inc. is a payments technology company. Founded by Jeremy Allaire and Sean Neville in 2013, it is currently headquartered in New York City and issues two types of stablecoin: USDC, which has a conversion rate pegged to the U.S. dollar, and EURC, which is euro-denominated. It also issues USYC, a tokenized money market fund.

The company's software platform enables users to move USDC across blockchains, as well as EURC and USYC. Circle had raised US$1.1 billion from investors by 2019. With $1.68 billion in revenue and reserve income in 2024, Circle went public on the NYSE in June 2025.

== History ==
=== Founding (2013–2017) ===
Circle was founded by Jeremy Allaire and Sean Neville in October 2013 in Boston, Massachusetts, with Allaire and Neville as co-CEOs. Circle was formed as a consumer finance company aiming to use the bitcoin blockchain as a payments platform. In March 2014 the company debuted its first product, the mobile payment platform Circle Pay. The bitcoin wallet service facilitated first bitcoin transactions and later ether transactions, and allowed users to send payments in a message accompanied by emojis or GIFs. In September 2015, Circle Pay began allowing users to hold, send, and receive fiat currencies as well as cryptocurrency.

In 2015, Circle began working with the UK bank Barclays in what was the first banking relationship between a large global bank and a bitcoin company. In 2016, Circle listed Dublin as its headquarters and was run primarily out of Boston. Products included Circle Invest, Circle Pay, and Circle Trade, among others, in December 2016 the Circle app stopped supporting the exchange of bitcoin, but still allowed money transfers. The company announced a partnership with Coinbase in late 2016. In October 2017, Circle launched a new service for group payments and cash transfers to US accounts.

=== Forming Centre and USDC (2018) ===
Circle raised US$110 million in venture capital in May 2018 to develop a new Ethereum stablecoin backed by USD. In September 2018, Circle introduced the consortium Centre, which launched the dollar-pegged cryptocurrency USDC. With members including Coinbase Global and Bitmain, Centre functioned as a platform through which users could deposit funds from traditional bank accounts, convert fiat currency into tokens, and redeem tokens for banknotes. Coinbase and Circle dissolved the Centre Consortium five years later, in August 2023, leaving Circle as the sole governor of USDC.

=== USDC expansion (2019–2023) ===
Circle Pay mobile and web apps were discontinued on September 30, 2019. Sean Neville resigned as co-CEO in late 2019, remaining on the board. Jeremy Allaire became sole CEO. In July 2021, Circle announced a plan to go public by merging with a special-purpose acquisition company called Concord Acquisition Corp in a $4.5 billion deal. In December 2022 the deal was terminated. Circle partnered with Robinhood in August 2022. In December 2022, Circle partnered with the U.N. High Commissioner for Refugees to distribute USDC to Ukrainian refugees, who could then exchange the stablecoins for local currencies.

Up until late 2022, USDC reserves were largely held at the Bank of New York Mellon. In late 2022, BlackRock began managing the USDC reserves, moving roughly 80% of the total into the Circle Reserve Fund, a money market fund with a mix of cash and short-term government debt (T-bills). On March 10, 2023, USDC announced that $3.3 billion of its $40 billion USDC reserves were held at Silicon Valley Bank when SVB collapsed. Within the month, Circle moved the reserves to The Bank of New York Mellon Corporation instead.

Circle selected Paris as its European headquarters in March 2023, at which point, Circle had licenses in 49 US states as well as Puerto Rico and the District of Columbia. In July 2023, Circle announced layoffs and stated that it had discontinued investments in non-core business areas. In September 2023, the company released a protocol enabling users to move USDC between blockchains. It also unveiled a programmable Web3 wallet platform. That month, Visa expanded a pilot program using USDC on the Solana blockchain to help pay some merchants in cryptocurrency. Later that year, Coinbase took an equity stake in Circle, and Circle announced that USDC would be available on six additional blockchains. With a $1 billion cash cushion, in 2023, Circle reported $1.45 billion in revenue, up from $772 million in 2022. It was named as one of the TIME 100 Most Influential Companies of 2023 by TIME.

=== Recent developments (2024–2026) ===
Circle Internet confidentially filed plans for a U.S. initial public offering in January 2024. The following month, Circle stopped supporting USDC token on the Tron network. According to data compiled by Visa, USDC overtook Tether in stablecoin transaction volume in April 2024. Circle partnered with Binance in December 2024, retaining its ties with Coinbase as well. Circle's net income in 2024 was $156 million, and Circle reported $1.68 billion in revenue and reserve income.

In April 2025, a bid by Ripple Labs to acquire Circle Internet Financial for $4 to $5 billion was rejected as being too low. USDC had a market capitalization of $60 billion in May 2025, remaining the second biggest stablecoin after Tether.

On May 27, 2025, Circle launched its IPO on the NYSE, seeking $624 million for a valuation of up to $6.7 billion. It listed on the NYSE on June 4, 2025. By its second day as a public company, stock had gained 247%, with market value rising to about $28.6 billion. On June 20, after the US senate passed the GENIUS Act clarifying potential stablecoin regulation, Circle's stock "rallied", at which point it was 675% higher than its IPO debut.

In July 2026, Circle received a final regulatory approval from the Office of the Comptroller of the Currency to form a ‌national trust bank; USDC's shares consequently jumped 10% in premarket trading.

In September 2026, it was announced that CFO Jeremy Fox-Geen will depart from his role in December after five years in that respective position.

Following a major security breach of Binance involving cryptocurrency assets valued at an estimated US$6.3 billion in October 2026, the largest cryptocurrency theft on record at that time, Circle froze over US$800 million in related assets.

== Acquisitions and sales ==
After receiving Financial Industry Regulatory Authority approval, Circle acquired SeedInvest in March 2019. In October 2019, Circle sold the cryptocurrency exchange Poloniex, which it had purchased in February 2018 for $400 million, to an investment firm.

In December 2019, Circle sold its Circle Trade business to Kraken. In February 2020, Circle sold its digital asset trading platform to Voyager Digital.

In November 2021, Circle led a US$13.5 million funding round in crowdfunding platform Crowdcube.

In January 2025, Circle acquired Hashnote, which operates a tokenized money market fund with $1.5 billion in assets under management. The acquisition included Hashnote's USYC (US Yield Coin) digital token.

In December 2025, it was announced that Circle had agreed to acquire the team and proprietary intellectual property of Interop Labs, a contributor to the Axelar Network. The transaction, expected to close in early 2026, brought Interop Labs’ cross-chain interoperability technology into Circle's blockchain infrastructure, while the Axelar Network and its governance remained independent.

== Funding ==
By April 2015, Circle had received over US$135 million in venture capital from four investment rounds, including US$50 million led by Goldman Sachs. Circle raised US$60 million in a Series D funding round in June 2016. By late 2019, Circle had raised $1.1 billion from investors such as Coinbase. It raised $400 million in April 2022 from investors such as BlackRock, Fidelity Investments, and Marshall Wace LLP.

== Licenses ==
The Circle website as of 2025 lists licenses to operate in 46 US states, the District of Columbia, Puerto Rico, the European Union, the United Kingdom, Singapore, the UAE, Bermuda, Canada, and Japan.

Previously, it was the first company to receive a number of newly created bitcoin licenses in various regions. Originally operating in Boston, in September 2015, Circle Internet Financial became the first firm to receive the new BitLicense issued by the New York State Department of Financial Services. Circle then became the first recipient of the British government's virtual currency licensure in April 2016. In June 2016, Circle announced it would expand its services to China through Circle China, an independent company. It later closed operations in China. Circle in late 2016 expanded into South Korea and the Philippines. In 2023, Circle received a Major Payment Institution license from the Monetary Authority of Singapore. In 2024 the company registered as an electronic money institution, or EMI, in France, opening up both USDC and the Circle stablecoin EURC to be issued in the European Union per the EU's Markets in Crypto-Assets, or MiCA, regulatory framework.

== Regulatory stance ==
Circle CEO Jeremy Allaire began lobbying US Congress in 2023 to provide clear rules for stablecoins. In 2023, at the World Economic Forum's annual meeting in Davos, Switzerland, Allaire stated that he wanted Circle to be regulated by the US Federal Reserve and become an established financial player to distinguish the company from then recent implosions in the crypto industry. After the passage of the Genius Act by the U.S. Senate in 2025, which regulates stable-coin reserves and transparency, Allaire said the bill would "drive US economic and national competitiveness for decades to come".

== Services and products ==
Circle issues two types of stablecoin: USDC and EURC. USDC has a conversion rate pegged to the US dollar, while EURC is a euro-denominated stablecoin. Circle also issues USYC, a tokenized money market fund backed by US Treasury holdings. The company's software enables users to move Circle stablecoin between blockchains, and services include a programmable web3 wallet platform enabling applications to store, send, and receive cryptocurrencies. Its Circle Mint platform allows businesses to mint and redeem Circle stablecoins in large volumes.

== Sponsorship ==
Circle became the official front-of-shirt sponsor of Premier League club Chelsea on 28 August 2026.

== See also ==
- List of online payment service providers
- List of tenants in One World Trade Center
