= Lose It! =

Fitness app

- Developers: FitNow, Inc.
- Initial release: 2008
- Operating system: iOS; Android; web
- Type: Health; fitness; calorie counter
- License: Proprietary
- Website: https://www.loseit.com/

Lose It! is an American health and wellness mobile app developed by FitNow, Inc. The app generates calorie budgets for users by tracking weight, exercise, food and calorie intake, and personal goals, primarily to assist them in achieving weight loss.

== History ==
Lose It! was developed in Boston and debuted in 2008. The app and its associated company were founded by J.J. Allaire, Charles Teague and Paul Dicristina. Prior to founding Lose It!, Teague and Allaire had founded the online research tool Onfolio, which was acquired by Microsoft in 2006. The Lose It! app was originally released as an iOS app before being released as a website in 2010 and an Android app in 2011.

In 2015, Lose It! announced plans to release the app internationally. Lose It! was also available as an app for Apple Watch at its launch in 2015.

The app’s “Snap It” feature, which allows users to approximate calorie counts by taking pictures of their daily meals and snacks, was released in beta in 2016. Snap It was named an Innovation Awards Honoree at the 2017 Consumer Electronics Show in Las Vegas.

In 2020, Patrick Wetherille, one of the company’s earliest employees, was appointed chief executive officer.

== App ==
Lose It! is weight loss app. The app allows users to set goals such as increasing strength, overall health/maintenance, and weight loss. It provides users recommended calorie budgets based on data such as their current weight and their desired weight. Lose It! also tracks data such as exercise/activity level and food consumption and allows users to track calories consumed by scanning barcodes for food products then retrieving calorie information for products. The app can also estimate the amount of calories in a food products.

Lose It! has integration features connecting it to other apps such as Fitbit and Runkeeper. It also has social features such as joining groups and sharing progress with friends. The Premium version of the app allows users to track foods according to specific diets like keto, heart healthy or Mediterranean.
