= Jeremy Allaire =

American technologist and entrepreneur

Jeremy D. Allaire
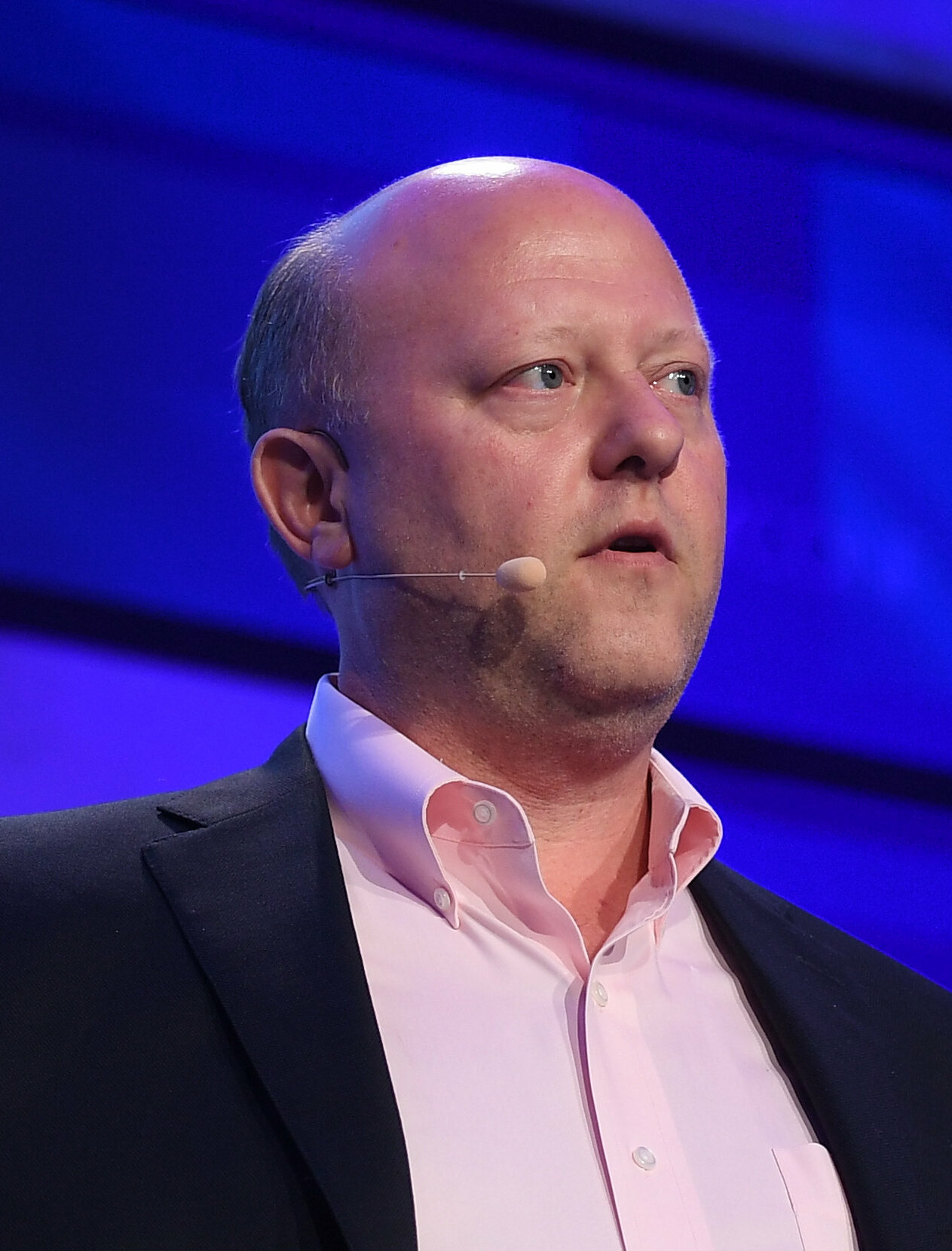
- Allaire in 2018
- Born: May 13, 1971 (age 55); Philadelphia, Pennsylvania
- Citizenship: United States
- Education: Macalester College
- Occupations: Technologist & Internet Entrepreneur
- Employer: Circle
- Known for: Creating the web development tool ColdFusion; co-founder of Allaire Corporation; former CTO at Macromedia involved in creating the Macromedia MX (Adobe Flash) platform; former Entrepreneur-in-Residence at General Catalyst; former CEO of Brightcove; current CEO of Circle
- Title: CEO & Founder
- Spouse: Jennifer Allaire (2011–present)

Jeremy D. Allaire (born 13 May 1971) is an American technologist and Internet entrepreneur. He is CEO and founder of the digital currency company Circle and chairman of the board of Brightcove. With his brother JJ Allaire, he co-founded the Allaire Corporation in 1995, which had an initial public offering (IPO) in January 1999 and was acquired by Macromedia in 2001. Allaire was chief technology officer (CTO) of Macromedia after the acquisition and helped develop the Macromedia MX platform (a suite of software tools and servers aimed at enabling rich applications delivered using Flash Player).

Allaire left Macromedia in February 2003 to join venture capital firm General Catalyst as a technologist and executive-in-residence. In 2004, Allaire founded Brightcove, an online video platform used by many media and marketing organizations worldwide. After a successful IPO in early 2012, Allaire stepped down as CEO in 2013.

In October 2013, Allaire announced the launch of Circle, an Internet-based consumer finance company that aims to bring the power and benefits of digital money, such as Bitcoin, to mainstream consumers.

== Early life and education ==
Allaire was educated in the Montessori tradition, which he says "built into me a belief in self-direction, in independent thought, in peer collaboration, in responsibility".

In 1993, Allaire graduated from Macalester College with a degree in political science and philosophy, with a concentration in economics. At Macalester, his college roommate and high-school friend, who worked for the campus IT group, rigged a high-speed Internet connection to their dorm room, which allowed Allaire to access and experiment with the Internet in its early days.

== Career ==
From 1990 until his graduation, Allaire became obsessed with the Internet and how it could be applied to transform systems of communications and media, as well as its impact on fundamental human rights, such as free speech. He was an early follower of the Electronic Frontier Foundation, and later recruited EFF founder Mitch Kapor to the board of directors of Allaire Corporation.

In 1992, Allaire authored a policy proposal for the creation of a National Information Network, based on the National Research & Education Network (NREN, the precursor to the commercial Internet), proposing methods to commercialize access to IP services. The paper was submitted to the Senate Subcommittee on Science and Technology, then chaired by Al Gore.

In 1992 and 1993, with a college friend, Allaire developed an application called "World News Report" that aggregated news feeds and mailing list content from independent media sources on the Internet, and provided a full-text indexed browsable and searchable interface to access independent journalism on the Internet, using Apple Hypercard.

Also while in college, Allaire created NativeNet, which created a decentralized communications and collaboration platform for Native American tribal schools in the Midwest, built on top of UUCP, an early internet protocol for distributed communications.

At Macalester, Allaire became more politically active, finding a particular interest in U.S. foreign policy and global human rights issues, including the impact of the collapse of the Soviet Union, the rise of authoritarian capitalist regimes in the east, and the Balkan Wars.

Upon graduating from Macalester, Allaire found that the Internet was “the central passion” in his life. In the fall of 1993, he launched an Internet-consulting firm, Global Internet Horizons, aimed at helping media publishers and marketers understand and build a presence on the nascent World Wide Web.

In 1994-1996, Allaire collaborated with Noam Chomsky and his wife, Carol, to develop the first comprehensive online archive of Chomsky's political works. Chomsky’s libertarian socialist and globalist views resonated with Allaire.

=== Allaire Corporation ===
In early 1994, Allaire became convinced that the architecture of the Web could disrupt how software was built and distributed, transforming the browser from a document browsing system into a full online operating system for any kind of software application.

In 1995, Jeremy and his brother J.J. Allaire, along with a group of close college friends, founded the Allaire Corporation, using $18,000 of J.J.’s savings. Allaire Corporation aimed to provide easy-to-use web development tools.

The brothers invented ColdFusion, a rapid web application development platform designed to easily connect simple HTML pages to a database using its associated scripting language, ColdFusion Markup Language (CFML). ColdFusion was widely used, and companies including Myspace, Target, and Toys R Us (along with millions of other websites) relied on the technology to develop their online properties.

Allaire Corporation grew rapidly, from just over $1 million in revenue in 1996 to $120 million in revenue in 2000, growing to over 700 employees with offices in North America, Europe, Asia and Australia. In addition to its flagship product ColdFusion, Allaire launched HomeSite, which became the world's most popular Windows HTML editor, and JRun, one of the first and most widely adopted Java app servers.

Allaire also helped to pioneer foundational ideas in open distributed computing based on lightweight HTTP-based distributed objects. In particular, the company developed the Web Distributed Data Exchange (WDDX) in 1998, an open source format for using HTTP for simple remote procedure calls, a precursor to the adoption of REST and JSON for web software APIs.

Allaire Corporation had its IPO in January 1999 and was acquired by Macromedia in March 2001 for $360 million in a deal that included cash and stock. As a result of this acquisition, Jeremy Allaire became CTO of Macromedia.

=== Macromedia ===
As CTO of Macromedia, Allaire helped to develop the Macromedia MX platform, a suite of software tools and servers for building and deploying content rich, interactive software applications on the Web.

After the Allaire/Macromedia merger, Allaire helped to drive platform and product strategy for Macromedia, including adding capabilities into Flash Player (a more advanced language runtime, web services connectivity, a component model) that enabled it to become a widely used platform for interactive software on the Web.

When Macromedia added video playback features into Flash Player in March 2002, Allaire became enthralled with the idea that the ubiquitous distribution of Flash Player on 98% of PCs in the world, combined with growth in broadband and WiFi adoption, would lead to a video publishing revolution on the Web. He started an internal product project at Macromedia code-named "Vista" that enabled easy browser-based capture, upload and publishing of video into any website, blog or instant message. When Macromedia decided not to pursue the project, Allaire left the company.

=== General Catalyst ===
In February 2003, Allaire became technologist and executive-in-residence at the venture capital firm General Catalyst Partners. At General Catalyst Partners, he focused on identifying investment opportunities in broadband media, mobile content, internet identity and security, and other Internet technologies.

At General Catalyst, Allaire began to incubate Brightcove, which was originally operating under stealth as Video Marketplace, Inc., or Vidmark, and he left General Catalyst in 2004 to launch this new venture.

=== Brightcove ===
In 2004, Allaire founded Brightcove, an online video platform that distributes video content across devices.

Brightcove filed for its initial IPO in 2012 with a valuation of around $290 million. Allaire stepped down as Brightcove’s CEO in the second quarter of 2013 to serve as chairman of the board.

=== Circle ===
In October 2013, Allaire launched Circle, a digital currency company that aims to bring digital money like Bitcoin to the mainstream, with $9 million in Series A funding from Jim Breyer, Accel Partners, and General Catalyst Partners.

Circle closed an additional $17 million Series B in March 2014 in a round led by Breyer Capital, Accel Partners, General Catalyst, and Oak Investment Partners. The company simultaneously announced the release of its product to a limited audience.

Allaire has said of Circle and Bitcoin, "We want to make this as easy to use as Gmail, Skype, and other consumer services on the Internet today". The company has received over $135 million in venture capital from four rounds of investments from 2013 to 2016, including $50 million led by Goldman Sachs.

In July 2021, Allaire announced that Circle would go public in a $4.5 billion SPAC merger. But Allaire and his planned SPAC partner, the CEO of Concord Acquisition Corp Bob Diamond, called off the merger. Analysts claimed the cancellation underscores the receding enthusiasm for both SPACs and cryptocurrencies on account of the "turbulent markets" that brought about a "bearish sentiment for risky bets."

In April 2025, Allaire announced that Circle would launch a "new payments and cross border remittance network" aimed at banks, fintechs, payment service providers, remittance providers and strategic partners of the USD Coin. In 2026, he was named one of TIME magazine's 100 most influential people of the year.
