= USDC (cryptocurrency) =

Cryptocurrency linked to the US dollar

- USD Coin logo

Denominations
- Code: USDC

Development
- White paper: USDC White Paper at the Wayback Machine (archived 2024-12-03)
- Initial release: September 2018
- Developer: Circle Internet Group

Website
- Website: usdc.com

USDC (USD Coin) is a cryptocurrency stablecoin issued by Circle Internet Group. It is pegged to the United States dollar, and is distinct from a central bank digital currency (CBDC).

== Usage ==
USDC operates as an Ethereum ERC-20 token and is also available on several other blockchain platforms, such as Base, Polygon, Avalanche and Algorand. Visa initiated a pilot program in 2023 to send USDC via the Solana blockchain to payment firms Worldpay and Nuvei, who could then transfer payment to merchants.

== Assets and reserves ==
As of 2020, USDC reserves were regularly attested (but not audited) by Grant Thornton LLP.

Until mid-2021, Circle stated that each USDC was backed by either one U.S. dollar in reserve or by other "approved investments", though the specifics of these investments were not disclosed. In June 2021, Circle updated its website wording from "backed by US dollars" to "backed by fully reserved assets".

In January 2023, Circle said it had engaged Deloitte as its auditor for USDC reserve reporting.

In December 2024, Forbes reported that USDC had $41 billion in assets under management.

== History ==
Circle Internet Group announced USDC on May 15, 2018, and it was subsequently launched in September of the same year by Centre, a consortium formed through a joint venture between Circle and Coinbase.

On March 29, 2021, Visa announced its support for USDC, enabling the cryptocurrency to be used for settling transactions within its payment network.

In July 2022, Circle reported that the circulation of USDC had reached $55 billion.

In December 2022, the United Nations High Commissioner for Refugees (UNHCR) held a pilot program to test the use of the USDC stablecoin to distribute cash assistance to Ukrainians displaced by the Russo-Ukrainian War. The pilot initially involved fewer than 100 participants.

On March 11, 2023, USDC temporarily lost its peg to the US dollar after Circle revealed that $3.3 billion dollars, about 8% of its reserves, were jeopardized due to the collapse of Silicon Valley Bank the day before. USDC regained its dollar peg four days later.

In August 2023, Circle and Coinbase dissolved the Centre Consortium, the entity responsible for managing USDC since 2018. This decision granted Circle full governance over USDC.

In February 2024, Circle discontinued USDC on the TRON blockchain following a risk management review. Although the minting of new USDC tokens halted on February 21, 2024, customers had until February 2025 to transfer USDC to other blockchains.

According to Forbes in December 2024, USDC primarily competes with Tether, which dominates the market by market capitalization. USDC and Tether nearly reached parity in 2022, but USDC declined coinciding with the collapse of Silicon Valley Bank, where Circle held reserves. According to data compiled by Visa, USDC overtook Tether in stablecoin transaction volume in August 2024.

On June 5, 2025, Circle was listed on the New York Stock Exchange via an initial public offering.

== See also ==
- Jeremy Allaire
- Tether (cryptocurrency)
