= WIDL (Internet Standard) =

WIDL (Web Interface Definition Language) is a 1997 proposal for interactions between website APIs. This interface description language is based on XML.
