= Macromedia HomeSite =

HTML editor owned by Adobe Systems

- Developers: Nick Bradbury, Allaire, Macromedia
- Release: September 1996; 29 years ago
- Final release: 5.5 / September 2003; 22 years ago
- Operating system: Windows
- Type: HTML editor
- License: Trialware
- Website: www.adobe.com/products/homesite/

HomeSite was an HTML editor originally developed by Nick Bradbury. Unlike WYSIWYG HTML editors such as FrontPage and Dreamweaver, HomeSite was designed for direct editing, or "hand coding", of HTML and other website languages.

After a successful partnership with the company to distribute it alongside its own competing Dreamweaver software, HomeSite was acquired by Macromedia in 2001, after which elements of the software were integrated into Dreamweaver. Following the acquisition of Macromedia by Adobe Systems, the company announced on May 26, 2009, that HomeSite would be discontinued.

== History ==
It was originally developed in Borland Delphi in 1995 by Nick Bradbury. Bradbury wrote HomeSite after using HotDog and being frustrated with it. In March 1997 Allaire Corporation from Cambridge, Massachusetts (founded by brothers Jeremy and J.J. Allaire) acquired HomeSite and Nick Bradbury joined Allaire. After leaving Allaire in 1998, Bradbury went on to work on the CSS/xHTML editor TopStyle and the RSS reader FeedDemon. Macromedia acquired Allaire in 2001 and was in turn acquired by Adobe in 2005.

At Allaire, a version of HomeSite was created as an IDE for ColdFusion, selling as ColdFusion Studio. This version was later merged into Coldfusion MX under Macromedia, and was then called HomeSite+. Development of HomeSite continued in parallel, though the standalone HomeSite was still sold separately.

In the days that HomeSite was under Nick Bradbury, and then part of Allaire, it had an enthusiastic following from its user community. While many software companies at the time had WYSIWYG (What You See Is What You Get) website creation tools where the user never saw the code, Nick Bradbury created a product that was code centric and popular with those that preferred to work directly in the code, a concept that was dubbed "What You See Is What You Need." Further he built in a variety of ways that users could customize the user interface and extend the functionality. Allaire kept this concept going as its target market of ColdFusion users were code-centric as well. Allaire developers expanded upon Nick's original HomeSite capabilities by adding features like built-in scripting, improved syntax coloring, and VTML for tag insight and tag editors.

Macromedia licensed a copy of HomeSite to include in Windows versions of Dreamweaver 1.0 (Mac versions bundled BBEdit). This OEM deal started the relationship between the companies and eventually led to the acquisition of Allaire by Macromedia in 2001. Although Macromedia improved the hand coding features in Dreamweaver 6.0 (MX) to be more on par with HomeSite, the company continued to produce both products separately, stating that "both products are excellent for their specific purposes." Macromedia was then acquired by Adobe in 2005. In May 2009, Adobe elected to cease development of HomeSite, and no longer supports the product, though they still maintain a forum for active users . Instead, existing HomeSite users are asked to consider switching to the newest version of Dreamweaver.

== Versions ==
- Homesite 1.x (September 1996)
- Allaire Homesite 2.0
- Allaire Homesite 2.5a (1997)
- Allaire HomeSite 3.0 (November 1997)
- Allaire HomeSite 4.0 (November 1998)
- Allaire HomeSite 4.5 (1999)
- Macromedia HomeSite 5.0 (2001)
- Macromedia HomeSite 5.2 (January 2003)
- Macromedia HomeSite 5.5 (September 2003)

There was also another version called HomeSite+ which was included in Dreamweaver MX 2004 and greater. HomeSite+ had additional functionality for ColdFusion application development, and was generally comparable to the version of HomeSite formerly called ColdFusion Studio. HomeSite+/CF Studio versions parallel standalone HomeSite versions.

== See also ==
- List of HTML editors
- Nick Bradbury
