= Li Fan (engineer) =

Computer scientist

- Education: B.S, Fudan University, 1996; M.S., University of Wisconsin, Madison, 1998
- Alma mater: Fudan University; University of Wisconsin, Madison
- Occupation: Computer scientist
- Employer: Circle

Li Fan is a computer scientist and the chief technology officer (CTO) at Circle. She has previously held positions at Lime, Pinterest, Google and Baidu. She is an expert in computer vision.

== Early life ==
Fan was interested in art as a child but was encouraged to focused on math. She studied computer science at Fudan University. She earned her bachelor's degree in 1996, after which she moved to University of Wisconsin–Madison for her graduate studies. There, she developed techniques for scalable web caching. She studied the potential of web prefetching between low-bandwidth clients and proxies.

== Career ==
Fan joined Cisco Systems as a software engineer. She joined Google in 2002. At Google she worked at google+, managing the infrastructure of ad spam and page ranking. In 2012, she was appointed Vice President of Engineering at Baidu. At Baidu, Fan launched the cross-function data processing group. Fan was responsible for product design at China's largest search engine and led 1,000 people. She worked on big data analytics. In 2014, she returned to Google and became Head of Image Search.

In 2016, Fan joined Pinterest as Head of Engineering. She built an artificial intelligence team to work on visual machine perception. She led a team of 400 engineers and developed their discovery engine.

Fan joined the e-scooter company LimeBike in 2018. She was named as one of the most important engineers in the world by Business Insider and one of the most creative people by Fast Company.

In 2021, Fan joined Circle as CTO.

== Award ==
- 2018 Forbes' America's Top 50 Women In Tech
