= Joseph J. Allaire =

American software engineer and entrepreneur (born 1969)

J. J. Allaire
- Born: Joseph J. Allaire; September 27, 1969 (age 57); South Bend, Indiana, U.S.
- Education: Macalester College
- Occupations: Entrepreneur, software engineer, inventor
- Known for: ColdFusion, Allaire Corporation, Macromedia, Windows Live Writer, Lose It!, RStudio
- Title: Creator of ColdFusion, Founder of Allaire Corporation, Founder of Onfolio, Creator of Windows Live Writer, Founder of FitNow, Creator of Lose It!, Founder of Posit (formerly RStudio)
- Relatives: Jeremy Allaire (brother)
- Website: github.com/jjallaire

Joseph J. Allaire (born 1969), better known professionally as J. J. Allaire, is an American-born software engineer and Internet entrepreneur. He created the ColdFusion programming language and web application server, founded Allaire Corporation, OnFolio, FitNow, and RStudio, and created Lose It! and Windows Live Writer. Allaire is currently the founder and CEO of statistical computing company Posit (formerly RStudio Inc).

== Early life ==
Joseph J Allaire received his bachelor's degree from Macalester College in St. Paul, Minnesota in 1991.

== ColdFusion and Allaire Corporation ==
In 1995, Allaire created ColdFusion. The same year, Allaire founded Allaire Corporation in Minneapolis, Minnesota.

Allaire moved the company to Cambridge, Massachusetts in 1996 with his brother and founding team member, Jeremy Allaire. Allaire served as the Chairman and CEO of Allaire Corporation, then as its Executive Vice President of Products after hiring David Orfao as the company's CEO.

Allaire Corporation had an initial public offering in 1999. In 2001, Allaire Corporation was acquired by Macromedia.

== Onfolio, Microsoft, and Windows Live Writer ==
In 2002, Allaire co-founded Onfolio with Adam Berrey and Charles Teague and led the development of its suite of tools for web research and publishing, released in 2004. Onfolio was acquired by Microsoft in 2006. At Microsoft, Allaire created a blog publishing product called Windows Live Writer, initially released in 2007. Windows Live Writer was distributed by Microsoft as part of Windows Essentials, until it was discontinued in 2015 and forked into an open-source version called Open Live Writer.

== FitNow and Lose It! ==
In 2008, Allaire, Paul DiCristina and Charles Teague co-founded FitNow, a company dedicated to mobile health and fitness applications, and created Lose It!, a mobile weight loss application with over 17 million users.

== RStudio ==
In 2009, Allaire founded RStudio, a company that builds tools for the R statistical computing environment. Allaire created the company's flagship product RStudio, a 2015 InfoWorld Technology of the Year Award recipient.

Beginning in 2013, Allaire worked on the R Markdown ecosystem of scientific publishing packages, including R Markdown, Distill for R, and Flexdashboard. From 2018 through 2020, Allaire worked on R interfaces to Python, and R versions of the TensorFlow and Keras Python packages.

In 2021, Allaire and Charles Teague created Quarto, a Jupyter-based scientific publishing system. Quarto was publicly announced in 2022.

== Inspect AI ==
In 2024, Allaire joined the UK AI Security Institute as a staff engineer, where he led the development of Inspect AI, an open-source framework for evaluating large language models. Inspect was first open-sourced in May 2024, and has since been adopted by research organisations including METR, Apollo Research, and SecureBio, model developers including Anthropic, Thinking Machines, and Hugging Face, and governments including the UK AI Security Institute and the US NIST Center for AI Standards and Innovation (CAISI).
