= Allaire Corporation =

American software company, creator of ColdFusion

- Type: Public
- Industry: Software
- Founded: May 1995; 31 years ago in Minnesota
- Founders: Jeremy Allaire; Joseph J. Allaire
- Defunct: January 2001; 25 years ago
- Fate: Acquired by Macromedia
- Headquarters: Newton, Massachusetts
- Products: ColdFusion, HomeSite, JRun

Allaire Corporation was an American computer software company founded by brothers Jeremy and JJ Allaire in Minnesota in May 1995, later headquartered in Cambridge and then Newton, Massachusetts. The company is best known for creating ColdFusion, a rapid application development platform that enabled developers to build database-driven websites using a tag-based scripting language. Allaire had its initial public offering on NASDAQ (ticker: ALLR) in January 1999 and was acquired by rival Macromedia in early 2001 for approximately $360 million.

== History ==
Allaire released the first version of the ColdFusion server in 1995. ColdFusion allowed developers to connect web pages to relational databases using a markup-style language called ColdFusion Markup Language (CFML), originally known as Database Markup Language (DBML). This approach made dynamic, data-driven websites significantly more accessible to developers who were not fluent in lower-level languages.

The company also produced two web development IDEs: HomeSite, acquired from Bradbury Software, and ColdFusion Studio, a version of HomeSite extended for ColdFusion development. In 2000, Allaire acquired Live Software, a company founded by Paul Colton in 1997, best known for creating JRun, one of the first commercial Java Servlet and JSP servers. Allaire also acquired the Kawa Java IDE from Tek-Tools Software that year. The company also produced an early web content management system called Spectra.

Macromedia acquired Allaire in early 2001. Macromedia was itself acquired by Adobe Systems in 2005 for $3.4 billion, bringing ColdFusion under Adobe's ownership, where it has continued to be developed and sold.
