= Comparison of Java virtual machines =

== Version information ==
Name	Creator	First public release	Latest stable version	Latest release date	Cost, availability	License
Eclipse OpenJ9 (formerly IBM J9)	IBM	15 Mar 2018	0.58.0	17 March 2026; 21 days ago	Free	Eclipse Public License 2.0; Apache License 2.0
GCJ	GNU	6 September 1998	6.4 (Terminal)	4 July 2017	Free	GPL version 2 or later, with the "libgcc exception"
GraalVM	Oracle	May 2019	Oracle GraalVM 25.0.2	20 January 2026; 2 months ago	Free	GPL version 2 only
HotSpot, OpenJDK edition	Sun Microsystems, Oracle	27 April 1999	jdk-16	16 March 2021	Free	GPL version 2 only
HotSpot, Oracle JDK edition	Sun Microsystems, Oracle	27 April 1999	jdk 16	16 March 2021	Free	Proprietary
HotSpot, Java SE embedded edition	Sun Microsystems, Oracle	27 April 1999	?	?	Commercial	Proprietary
HotSpot, Zero port	Gary Benson	?	?	?	Free	GPL version 2 only
IKVM	Jeroen Frijters	28 June 2004	8.15.0	6 December 2025; 4 months ago	Free	zlib License
JamVM	Robert Lougher	13 March 2003	2.0.0	30 July 2014	Free	GPL version 2 or later
Jikes RVM	IBM	14 October 2001	3.1.4	18 February 2016	Free	Eclipse Public License version 1.0
Kaffe	Transvirtual Technologies	1996	1.1.9	22 February 2008	Free	GPL version 2 or later
SableVM	Sable Research Group	?	1.13	30 March 2007	Free	LGPL version 2.1 or later

== Technical information ==
JVM	Status	Latest supported Java version	Supported class libraries			Performance		
JVM	Status	Latest supported Java version	GNU Classpath	OpenJDK	Other	Interpretation	AOT	JIT
GCJ	No longer maintained or distributed by GNU as of GCC 7	?	Yes	No		Yes	Yes	No
HotSpot, OpenJDK edition	Reference implementation.	1.8	No	Yes		Yes	No	Yes
HotSpot, Oracle JDK edition	Reference implementation.	1.8	No	Yes		Yes	No	Yes
HotSpot, Java SE embedded edition		?	No	Yes		Yes	No	Yes
HotSpot, Zero port	Interpreter-only port of OpenJDK using almost no assembly language and designed to be very portable.	1.7	No	Yes		Yes	No	No
IKVM		1.8	?	?		Depends on .NET runtime		
JamVM		1.8	Yes	Yes		Yes	No	Yes
Jikes RVM		1.6	Yes	Port	Apache Harmony	No	?	Yes
Kaffe		1.4	Yes	No		Yes	No	Yes
SableVM	Unmaintained	1.4	Yes	No		Yes	No	No

== Supported CPU architectures ==
JVM	x86	x86-64	SPARC	MIPS	Itanium	Power ISA	ARM	Alpha	S/390	z/Architecture	m68k
GCJ	Yes	Yes	Yes	Yes	Yes	Yes	Yes	Yes	Yes	No	No
HotSpot, OpenJDK edition	Yes	Yes	Solaris only	Port	No	PowerPC/AIX port	Yes	No	No	No	No
HotSpot, Oracle JDK edition	Yes	Yes	Solaris only	No	Java 1.6	No	Yes	No	No	No	No
HotSpot, Java SE embedded edition	Yes	Yes	Yes	?	?	Yes	Yes	?	?	?	?
HotSpot, Zero port	Yes	Yes	No	Yes	Yes	Yes	Yes	Yes	No	Yes	No
IKVM	Depends on .NET runtime										
JamVM	Yes	Yes	Yes	Yes	No	Yes	Yes	No	No	No	No
Jikes RVM	Yes	No	No	No	No	Yes	No	No	No	No	No
Kaffe	Yes	Yes	Yes	Yes	Yes	Yes	Yes	Yes	Yes	No	Yes
SableVM	Yes	Yes	Yes	Yes	Yes	Yes	Yes	Yes	Yes	No	Yes

== Supported operating systems ==
JVM	Windows	Linux	FreeBSD	NetBSD	OpenBSD	Solaris	OpenSolaris	Darwin	macOS	AIX	IRIX	Other
GCJ	Yes	Yes	Yes	?	?	Yes	?	Yes	Yes	?	Yes	DEC OSF 4.0f and 5.1, Hitachi SH-3/4 micro-controller
HotSpot, OpenJDK edition	Yes (distributed as source code)	Yes	Port	Port	Port	Yes	Yes	?	Yes	Port	No	OS/2port, Haiku port
HotSpot, Oracle JDK edition	Yes	Yes	No	No	No	Yes	?	?	Yes	No	No	
HotSpot, Java SE embedded edition	Yes	Yes	No	No	No	Yes	?	No	No	No	No	
HotSpot, Zero port	No	Yes	No	No	No	No	No	No	No	No	No	
IKVM	Depends on .NET runtime											
JamVM	No	Yes	Yes	No	Yes	Yes	Yes	Yes	Yes	No	No	Jailbroken iPhone, kFreeBSD
Jikes RVM	No	Yes	No	No	No	No	No	No	Yes	Yes	No	
Kaffe	Using Cygwin	Yes	Yes	Yes	Yes	Yes	?	Yes	Yes	Yes	Yes	AmigaOS, BeOS, several others
SableVM	Using Cygwin	Yes	Yes	?	?	?	?	?	Yes	?	?	
