= Free Java implementations =

Free Java implementations are software projects that implement Oracle's Java technologies and are distributed under free software licences, making them free software. Sun released most of its Java source code as free software in May 2007, so it can now almost be considered a free Java implementation. Java implementations include compilers, runtimes, class libraries, etc. Advocates of free and open source software refer to free or open source Java virtual machine software as free runtimes or free Java runtimes.

Some advocates in this movement prefer not to use the term "Java" as it has trademark issues associated with it. Hence, even though it is a "free Java movement", the term "free Java runtimes" is avoided by them.

== Mid-1990s to 2006 ==
The first free project to offer substantial parts of Java platform functionality was likely guavac, which began some time before November 1995.

Since then, the free software movement developed other Java compilers, most notably the GNU Compiler for Java. Others include the Eclipse Java Compiler (ECJ), which is maintained by the Eclipse Foundation, and Jikes, which is no longer actively maintained. Since the GNU Compiler Collection's 4.3 release, GCJ (its Java compiler) is using the ECJ parser front-end for parsing Java.

Examples of free runtime environments include Kaffe, SableVM and gcj.

GNU Classpath is the main free software class library for Java. Most free runtimes use GNU Classpath as their class library.

In May 2005, Apache Harmony was announced, however, the project chose the Apache License, which was at the time incompatible with all existing free Java implementations.

Another event in May 2005 was the announcement that OpenOffice.org 2.0 would depend on Java features which free software implementations couldn't provide. Following controversy, OpenOffice.org adopted a guideline requiring it to work with free Java implementations.

Notable applications that already worked with free software Java implementations before November 2006 include OpenOffice.org and Vuze, both of which work when compiled with GCJ.

== Sun's November 2006 announcement ==
On November 13, 2006, Sun released its compiler, javac, under the GNU General Public License.

As of September 2007, as well as javac, Sun has released the code of HotSpot (the virtual machine) and almost all the Java Class Library as free software.

Following their promise to release a fully buildable JDK based almost completely on free and open source code in the first half of 2007, Sun released the complete source code of the Class library under the GPL on May 8, 2007, except some limited parts that were licensed by Sun from 3rd parties who did not want their code to be released under a free software licence. Sun has stated that it aims to replace the parts that remain proprietary and closed source with alternative implementations and make the class library completely free and open source. Since there's some encumbered code in the JDK, Sun will continue to use that code in commercial releases until it's replaced by fully functional free and open-source alternatives.

== After the May 2007 code release ==
As of May 2008, the only part of the Class library that remains proprietary (4% as of May 2007 for OpenJDK 7, and less than 1% as of May 2008 in OpenJDK 6) is the SNMP implementation.

Since the first May 2007 release, Sun Microsystems, with the help of the community, has released as free software (or replaced with free-software alternatives) almost all the encumbered code:

- All the audio engine code, including the software synthesizer, has been released as open-source. The closed-source software synthesizer has been replaced by a new synthesizer developed specifically for OpenJDK called Gervill,
- All cryptography classes used in the Class library have been released as free software,
- FreeType has replaced the code that scales and rasterizes fonts.
- LittleCMS has replaced the native color-management system. There is a pluggable layer in the JDK, so that the commercial version can use the old color management system and OpenJDK can use LittleCMS.
- The open-sourced Pisces renderer used in the phoneME project has replaced the anti-aliasing graphics rasterizer code. This code is fully functional, but still needs some performance enhancements,
- The JavaScript plugin has been open-sourced (the JavaScript engine itself was open-sourced from the beginning).

Because of these previously encumbered components, it was not possible to build OpenJDK only with free software components. In order to be able to do this before the whole class library is made free, and to be able to bundle OpenJDK in Fedora Core and other free Linux distributions, Red Hat has started a project called IcedTea. It is basically an OpenJDK/GNU Classpath hybrid that can be used to bootstrap OpenJDK using only free software.

As of March 2008, the Fedora 9 distribution has been released with OpenJDK 6 instead of the IcedTea implementation of OpenJDK 7. Some of the stated reasons for this change are:

- Sun has replaced most of the encumbrances for which IcedTea was providing replacements (less than 1% of encumbered code remains in the class library, and this code is not necessary to run OpenJDK).
- OpenJDK 6 was a stable branch, whereas OpenJDK 7 was unstable and not expected to ship a stable release until 2009.
- Sun has licensed the OpenJDK trademark for use in Fedora.

In June 2008, it was announced that IcedTea 6 (as the packaged version of OpenJDK on Fedora 9) had passed the Technology Compatibility Kit tests and can claim to be a fully compatible Java 6 implementation.

In September 2013, Azul Systems released Zulu, a free, open source build of OpenJDK for Windows Server and the Microsoft Azure Cloud. Later releases added support for Mac OS X, multiple versions of Linux and the Java Platform, Standard Edition version 8. Zulu is certified compliant with Java SE 8, 7 and 6 using the OpenJDK Community Technology Compatibility Kit.

Amazon have released Amazon Corretto a no-cost, multiplatform, production-ready distribution of the Open Java Development Kit. It is released under GPL v2 with the Classpath Exception. Long-term support versions of Java 8 and Java 11 are available. It was first publicly released on January 31, 2019.

In 2017, the Eclipse Foundation released AdoptOpenJDK, now named Adoptium, whose main goal is "to promote and support free and open-source high-quality runtimes and associated technology for use across the Java ecosystem."

== See also ==
- Java (software platform)
- javac
- HotSpot
- Apache Harmony
- OpenJDK
- GNU Classpath and GCJ
- IcedTea
- JamVM
- IKVM
- List of Java virtual machines
- Comparison of Java virtual machines
- Adoptium
