= Java Development Kit =

Software development tools for developing Java applications

- Developer: Oracle Corporation

Stable release(s)
- 27.0.1.0.3 (October 24, 2026; 17 days ago) [±] 25.0.5.0.3 LTS (October 24, 2026; 17 days ago) [±] 21.0.13.0.3 LTS (October 24, 2026; 17 days ago) [±] 17.0.21.0.3 LTS (October 24, 2026; 17 days ago) [±] 11.0.33.0.3 LTS (October 24, 2026; 17 days ago) [±] 8u511b33 LTS (October 24, 2026; 17 days ago) [±]
- Written in: Java, C++, C, Assembly
- Operating system: Windows, macOS, Linux
- Platform: AArch64, x86-64
- License: Oracle No-Fee Terms and Conditions (NFTC) with third party components
- Website: oracle.com/java/technologies/

The Java Development Kit (JDK) is a software development kit for development of a Java platform application.

The JDK is designed to be mainly used to communicate with the Java Runtime Environment (JRE), but it can be replaced by other JDK-based languages which can communicate with the JRE and JVM. Furthermore, Java bytecode can be compiled statically directly into native code only with a JVM but without the necessity of the Java runtime environment running dynamically.

It implements the Java Language Specification (JLS) and the Java Virtual Machine Specification (JVMS) and provides the Standard Edition (SE) of the Java Application Programming Interface (API). It is derivative of the community driven OpenJDK which Oracle stewards. It provides software for working with Java applications. Examples of included software are the Java virtual machine, a compiler, performance monitoring tools, a debugger, and other utilities that Oracle considers useful for Java programmers.

Oracle releases the current version of the software under the Oracle No-Fee Terms and Conditions (NFTC) license. Oracle releases binaries for the x86-64 architecture for Windows, macOS, and Linux based operating systems, and for the aarch64 architecture for macOS and Linux. Previous versions supported the Oracle Solaris operating system and SPARC architecture.

Oracle's primary implementation of the JVMS is known as HotSpot.

== JDK contents ==
The JDK has as its primary components a collection of programming tools, including:

- appletviewer – this tool can be used to run and debug Java applets without a web browser
- apt – the annotation-processing tool
- extcheck – a utility that detects JAR file conflicts
- idlj – the IDL-to-Java compiler. This utility generates Java bindings from a given Java IDL file.
- jabswitch – the Java Access Bridge. Exposes assistive technologies on Microsoft Windows systems.
- java – the loader for Java applications. This tool is an interpreter and can interpret the class files generated by the javac compiler. Now a single launcher is used for both development and deployment. The old deployment launcher, jre, no longer comes with Sun JDK, and instead it has been replaced by this new java loader.
- javac – the Java compiler, which converts source code into Java bytecode
- javadoc – the documentation generator, which automatically generates documentation from source code comments
- jar – the archiver, which packages related class libraries into a single JAR file. This tool also helps manage JAR files.
- javafxpackager – tool to package and sign JavaFX applications
- jarsigner – the jar signing and verification tool
- javah – the C header and stub generator, used to write native methods
- javap – the class file disassembler
- javaws – the Java Web Start launcher for JNLP applications
- JConsole – Java Monitoring and Management Console
- jdb – the debugger
- jhat – Java Heap Analysis Tool (experimental)
- jinfo – This utility gets configuration information from a running Java process or crash dump. (experimental)
- jmap Oracle jmap – Memory Map– This utility outputs the memory map for Java and can print shared object memory maps or heap memory details of a given process or core dump. (experimental)
- jmc – Java Mission Control
- jpackage – a tool for generating self-contained application bundles. (experimental)
- jps – Java Virtual Machine Process Status Tool lists the instrumented HotSpot Java Virtual Machines (JVMs) on the target system. (experimental)
- jrunscript – Java command-line script shell.
- jshell – a read–eval–print loop, introduced in Java 9.
- jstack – utility that prints Java stack traces of Java threads (experimental)
- jstat – Java Virtual Machine statistics monitoring tool (experimental)
- jstatd – jstat daemon (experimental)
- keytool – tool for manipulating the keystore
- pack200 – JAR compression tool
- policytool – the policy creation and management tool, which can determine policy for a Java runtime, specifying which permissions are available for code from various sources.
- VisualVM – visual tool integrating several command-line JDK tools and lightweight performance and memory profiling capabilities (no longer included in JDK 9+)
- wsimport – generates portable JAX-WS artifacts for invoking a web service.
- xjc – Part of the Java API for XML Binding (JAXB) API. It accepts an XML schema and generates Java classes.

Experimental tools may not be available in future versions of the JDK.

The JDK also comes with a complete Java Runtime Environment (JRE), usually called a private runtime, due to the fact that it is separated from the "regular" JRE and has extra contents. It consists of a Java virtual machine and all of the class libraries present in the production environment, as well as additional libraries only useful to developers, such as the internationalization libraries and the IDL libraries.

Copies of the JDK also include a wide selection of example programs demonstrating the use of almost all portions of the Java API.

== Other JDKs ==
In addition to the most widely used JDK discussed in this article, there are other JDKs commonly available for a variety of platforms, some of which started from the Sun JDK source and some that did not. All adhere to the basic Java specifications, but often differ in explicitly unspecified areas, such as garbage collection, compilation strategies, and optimization techniques. They include:

In development or in maintenance mode:

- Azul Systems Zing, low latency JDK for Linux;
- Azul Systems / OpenJDK-based Zulu for Linux, Windows, Mac OS X, embedded and the cloud;
- GraalVM GraalVM is an advanced JDK with ahead-of-time Native Image compilation.
- OpenJDK / IcedTea;
- Aicas JamaicaVM;
- IBM J9 JDK, for AIX, Linux, Windows, MVS, OS/400, Pocket PC, z/OS;

Not being maintained or discontinued:

- Apache Harmony;
- Apple's Mac OS Runtime for Java JVM/JDK for Classic Mac OS;
- Blackdown Java – Port of Sun's JDK for Linux;
- GNU's Classpath and GCJ (The GNU Compiler for Java);
- Oracle Corporation's JRockit JDK, for Windows, Linux, and Solaris.

== See also ==
- Classpath
- Java platform
- Java version history

== Notes ==
1. Although the JDK is a development kit, all its modules could be replaced by another one of a language that is compatible with the JVM and JRE, compiling its code to bytecode. There is a misunderstanding about the JDK including the JRE and JVM; the JDK usually uses both. Of course, the JDK only works with the JRE and JVM, but the JRE and JVM don’t, so the JDK is dependent on them because it communicates using bytecode. The inverse isn’t valid because the JVM and JRE don’t depend exclusively on the JDK, which is written in Java. They are independent in existence dependent of the perspective and aren’t used by the user who only executes the Java application but does not develop it.
