= Java Class Library =

Core Java libraries

The Java Class Library (JCL) is a set of dynamically loadable libraries that Java Virtual Machine (JVM) languages can call at run time. It is the standard library of Java and other JVM languages, and is thus sometimes called the Java Standard Library. Because the Java Platform is not dependent on a specific operating system, applications cannot rely on any of the platform-native libraries. Instead, the Java Platform provides a comprehensive set of standard class libraries, containing the functions common to modern operating systems. Since Java 9, the Java Class Library can be accessed through module path using the Java Platform Module System.

JCL serves three purposes within the JVM:

- Like other standard code libraries, they provide the programmer a well-known set of useful facilities, such as container classes and regular expression processing.
- The library provides an abstract interface to tasks that would normally depend heavily on the hardware and operating system, such as network access and file access.
- Some underlying platforms may not support all of the features a Java application expects. In these cases, the library implementation can either emulate those features or provide a consistent way to check for the presence of a specific feature.

It uses the namespaces java, javax, and jdk. Some bundled classes may reside in namespaces like sun or com.sun (for Sun Microsystems), but they are not considered part of the standard library. The javax namespace was primarily associated with Java Platform, Enterprise Edition as extension packages to the Java standard library; those part of Enterprise Edition now reside in jakarta.

== Implementation and configuration ==
JCL is almost entirely written in Java, except for the parts that need direct access to the hardware and operating system (such as for I/O or bitmap graphics), which are instead written in C++. The classes that give access to these functions commonly use Java Native Interface wrappers to access operating system APIs.

Almost all of JCL is stored in a single Java archive file called "rt.jar" which is provided with JRE and JDK distributions. The Java Class Library (rt.jar) is located in the default bootstrap classpath and does not have to appear in the classpath declared for the application. The runtime uses the bootstrap class loader to find the JCL.

The Java Module System (part of the Java 9 release) broke the monolithic "rt.jar" JAR file and modularized the JCL itself in several modules with specified dependencies.

== Conformance ==
Any Java implementation must pass the Java Technology Compatibility Kit tests for compliance, which includes JCL tests.

== Main features ==
JCL Features are accessed through classes provided in packages.

- java.lang contains fundamental classes and interfaces closely tied to the language and runtime system.
- I/O and networking access the platform file system, and more generally networks through the java.io, java.nio and java.net packages. For networking, SCTP is available through com.sun.nio.sctp.
- Mathematics: java.math provides mathematical expressions and evaluation, as well as arbitrary-precision decimal and integer number datatypes.
- Collections and utilities : built-in collection data structures, and utility classes, for regular expressions, concurrency, logging and data compression.
- GUI and 2D graphics: the AWT package (java.awt) basic GUI operations and binds to the underlying native system. It also contains the 2D Graphics API. The Swing package (javax.swing) is built on AWT and provides a platform-independent widget toolkit, as well as a pluggable look and feel. It also deals with editable and non-editable text components.
- Sound: interfaces and classes for reading, writing, sequencing, and synthesizing of sound data, as well as MIDI, in javax.sound.
- Text: java.text deals with text, dates, numbers and messages.
- Image package: java.awt.image and javax.imageio provide APIs to write, read, and modify images.
- XML: SAX, DOM, StAX, XSLT transforms, XPath and various APIs for Web services, as SOAP protocol and JAX-WS.
- Security is provided by java.security and encryption services are provided by javax.crypto.
- Databases: access to SQL databases via java.sql
- Access to scripting engines: The javax.script package gives access to any conforming Scripting language.
- Applets: java.applet allows applications to be downloaded over a network and run within a guarded sandbox
- Java Beans: java.beans provides ways to manipulate reusable components.
- Introspection and reflection: java.lang.Class represents a class, but other classes such as java.lang.reflect.Method and java.lang.reflect.Constructor are available in java.lang.reflect.

=== Packages outside of the main namespace ===
Java bundles some packages outside of the main namespaces (java, javax, and jdk). Among these include:

- com.sun: some internal packages originally developed by Sun Microsystems, for HotSpot VM, abstract syntax tree, Java Debug Interface, and HTTP servers.
- netscape.javascript: classes for accessing the JavaScript engine and HTML DOM in the web browser. Deprecated in Java 24 and removed in Java 26, moved to JavaFX.
- org.ietf.jgss: Generic Security Service API as specified by the Internet Engineering Task Force.
- org.omg (such as org.omg.CORBA): Object Management Group packages, such as Common Object Request Broker Architecture (CORBA) features. Deprecated since Java 9, removed since Java 11.
- org.w3c.dom: Document Object Model packages as specified by the World Wide Web Consortium.
- org.xml.sax: Simple API for XML packages related to XML.

=== Implementation packages ===
The sun (which contains the sun.misc.Unsafe class, used to manipulate the CPU and hardware, directly manage memory, and other things) and other com.sun packages are all part of a module called jdk.unsupported. This module contains packages not part of the Java standard library but bundled as part of the Java implementation.

== Licensing ==
=== Prior licenses ===
Before the release of OpenJDK, the JDK was based on a proprietary license.

Following their promise to release a fully buildable JDK based on almost completely free and open-source code in the first half of 2007, Sun released the complete source code of the Class Library under the GPL on May 8, 2007, except some limited parts that were licensed by Sun from third parties who did not want their code to be released under an open-source license. Sun's goal was to replace the parts that remain proprietary and closed source with alternative implementations and make the Class Library completely free and open source.

Until December 2010, the remaining encumbered part of the JDK was made available by Sun then Oracle as Binary Plugs which were required to build the JDK but not necessary to run it. as of May 2007, the only part of the Class library that remained proprietary and closed-source (4% as of May 2007 for OpenJDK 7, and less than 1% as of May 2008 and OpenJDK 6) was the SNMP implementation.

Since the first May 2007 release, Sun, with the help of the community, released as open-source or replaced with open-source alternatives almost all the encumbered code:

- All the audio engine code, including the software synthesizer, became open source. The closed-source software synthesizer has been replaced by a new synthesizer developed specifically for OpenJDK called Gervill.
- All cryptography classes were released as open-source.
- The code that scales and rasterizes fonts uses open source FreeType.
- The native color management uses open-source LittleCMS. There is a pluggable layer in the JDK, so that the commercial release of Java can use the original, proprietary color management system and OpenJDK can use LittleCMS.
- The anti-aliasing graphics rasterizer code uses the open source Pisces renderer used in the phoneME project.
- The JavaScript plugin is open source (the JavaScript engine itself was open source from the beginning).

=== Open source release ===
Beginning in December 2010, all the so-called binary plugs were replaced by open source replacements, making the entire JDK open.

== Alternative implementations ==
GNU Classpath is the other main free software class library for Java. Contrary to other implementations, it only implements the Class Library, and is used by many free Java runtimes (like Kaffe, SableVM, JamVM).

Apache Harmony was another free software class library. Its aim was to implement the other parts of the Java stack (Virtual Machine, Compiler, and other tools required for any Java implementation).

== See also ==
- Java Platform, Standard Edition
- List of Java APIs
- OpenJDK
- Free Java implementations
- Standard library
- Java applet
