= MRJ =

MRJ, Mrj or mrj may refer to:

- Mitsubishi Regional Jet
- Mac OS Runtime for Java
- Movement for Reform Judaism
- Miraj Junction railway station code
- Hill Mari language, ISO 639 code
