= Blackdown Java =

Blackdown Java was a Linux port of Sun Microsystems's Java virtual machine, developed by a group of volunteers led by Juergen Kreileder, Steve Byrne, and Karl Asha, and included a team of volunteers from around the globe. The first version, 1.0.2, was released in October 1996, predating Sun's official Linux port.

Blackdown Java supported Linux on architectures that the official version did not, including SPARC and PowerPC. The Blackdown project ended in August 2007, after Sun released an open source version of the HotSpot JVM as part of OpenJDK; OpenJDK is available under the free GNU General Public License. The Java software itself still exists on many mirrors.

At its close, Blackdown supported J2SE versions 1.4.2 on i386 and AMD64, 1.4.1 on SPARC, and 1.3.1 on PowerPC. Work on J2SE 1.5.x support for x86, AMD64, SPARC, and PowerPC had been announced, but was never released.

In 1999 Sun Microsystems and Inprise announced a port of Java to Linux. The port was based on Blackdown work, but the Blackdown team was not recognized or given any credit for the release. After some controversy, Sun publicly apologized to the Blackdown developers. The incident revealed that there were long standing problems between Sun and Blackdown.

Despite widespread confusion, Blackdown was neither free software nor open-source software; this was due to licensing restrictions from Sun Microsystems. Its binary redistribution policy allowed it to be pre-installed or included with many Linux distributions (e.g., Gentoo Linux), whereas at the time, Sun Java's binary redistribution policy did not. Since Java 5, the Operating System Distributor License for Java (DLJ) met many Linux distributions' requirements, lessening the demand for the older Blackdown JVM.

The Blackdown team pioneered Sun's involvement with external, volunteer efforts. Steve Byrne, who was working at Sun at the time, worked with Sun legal to establish an agreement to license the Java test suite for a few Blackdown participants at no cost, and this was used to certify the Blackdown Java implementation as being 100% Java compatible.

The Blackdown team received recognition at the JavaOne conference in 1998 for the work that the team had been doing.
