= Jikes =

Open-source Java compiler

- Developer: IBM
- Final release: 1.22 / October 3, 2004; 21 years ago
- Written in: C++
- Operating system: Cross-platform
- Type: Java compiler
- License: IBM Public License
- Website: jikes.sourceforge.net

Jikes is an open-source Java compiler written in C++. It is no longer being updated.

The original version was developed by David L. "Dave" Shields and Philippe Charles at IBM but was quickly transformed into an open-source project contributed to by an active community of developers. Initially hosted by IBM, the project was later transferred to SourceForge. Among its accomplishments, it was much faster in compiling small projects than Sun's own compiler, and provided more helpful warnings and errors.

== Project status ==
As of 2010 the project is no longer being actively developed. The last 1.22 version was released in October 2004 and partially supports Java 5.0 (with respect to new classes, but not new language features). As no further versions were released since, Java SE 6 is not supported.

While the free software community needed free Java implementations, the GNU Compiler for Java became the most commonly used compiler.

== See also ==
- Jikes RVM
