= GNU Classpath =

GNU implementation of the Java Class Library

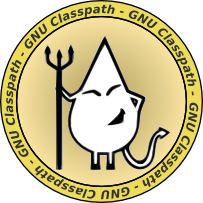

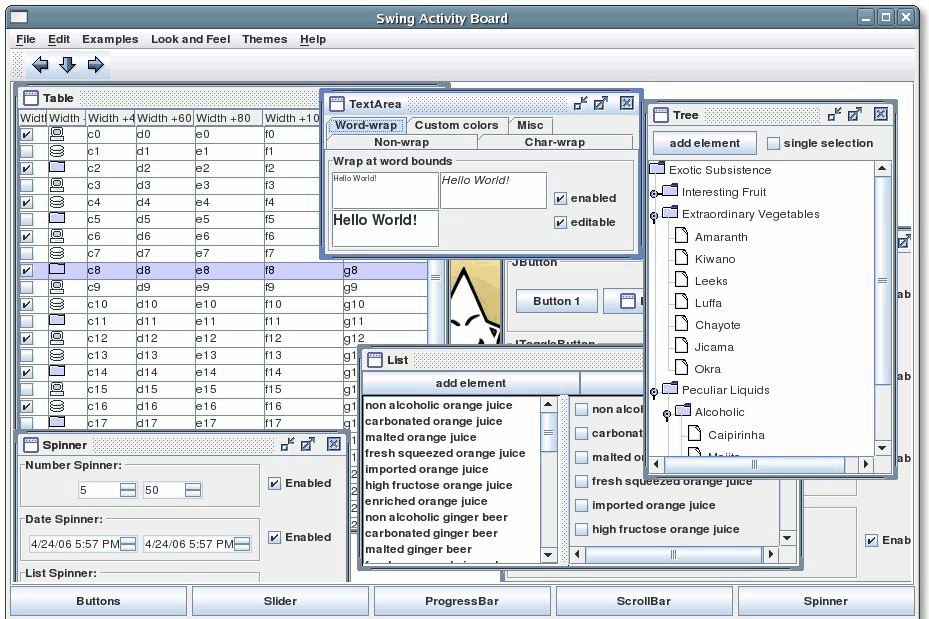
- Screenshot Demonstration of the GNU Classpath Swing
- Developers: GNU Project (formally held by FSF)
- Final release: 0.99 / March 16, 2012; 14 years ago
- Written in: Java (some parts in C and C++)
- Operating system: Cross-platform
- Type: Library
- License: GPL linking exception
- Website: www.gnu.org/software/classpath/
- Repository: git.savannah.gnu.org/cgit/classpath.git

GNU Classpath is a free software implementation of the standard class library for the Java programming language. Most classes from J2SE 1.4 and 5.0 are implemented. Classpath can thus be used to run Java-based applications. GNU Classpath is a part of the GNU Project. It was originally developed in parallel with libgcj due to license incompatibilities, but later the two projects merged.

GNU Classpath was deemed a high priority project by the Free Software Foundation. When the Classpath project began, the license for the official Java implementation from Sun Microsystems did not allow distribution of any alterations. Since the inception of the Classpath project, the OpenJDK was released under the GPL and now serves as the official reference implementation for the Java platform.

== License ==
GNU Classpath is licensed under the GNU General Public License with a linking exception. This is a free software license. All code is formally owned by the Free Software Foundation, and this owner is bound by its own contractual obligations to the developers.

== Uses ==
GNU Classpath is used by many free Java runtimes (like Kaffe, SableVM, JamVM, Jikes RVM, and VMKit) because every full-featured Java virtual machine must provide an implementation of the standard class libraries.

Some other uses include:

- The GNU Compiler for Java, which is capable of compiling Java code into native standalone executables.
- GCJAppletViewer for launching Java applets from command line if they are not supported by the browser in use.
- IKVM, which integrates Java with the .NET Framework
- JNode, an operating system for running Java applications. This system is written in Java and assembler only.
- Specialised virtual machines such as Jaos for integration with the Oberon programming language, and JamaicaVM for embedded systems with real-time guarantees.
- Virtual machines for distributed computing with clusters, having up to 128 processors on Myrinet.
- The IcedTea project used GNU Classpath as a replacement for proprietary elements of OpenJDK, prior to their replacement upstream.

== History ==
GNU Classpath development started in 1998 with five developers. During the history, it merged several times with other projects having similar goals (Kaffe, libgcj). In the past, GNU Classpath supplied its own virtual machine (Japhar). As Classpath was becoming a base library, shared with a lot of different projects, this virtual machine received less and less attention and is now no longer supported.

After implementing the majority of the official Java 1.4 API, the work in the project became more bug oriented rather than API coverage oriented. On October 24, 2006, the implementation of the last missing 1.4 class, javax.swing.text.html.HTMLWriter, was committed. The development speed (computed mathematically as the average number of the new lines of code per day) reached its highest ever in 2006.

The name GNU Classpath was originally suggested by Bradley M. Kuhn to one of the first developers, Paul Fisher. At the time, there was great concern in the Free Java implementations community about enforcement of Sun's trademark on Java against free implementations. Kuhn suggested the name $CLASSPATH, which is the environment variable used by most Java systems to indicate where the Java libraries reside on the computer. Since $CLASSPATH often expanded to a path name that included the word java (such as /usr/lib/java), it was a way to evoke the name Java without actually saying it. Fisher and other developers didn't like the unsightly use of the $ and all capital letters and settled on Classpath.

== Development team ==
The maintainer takes care of the legal side of the project, prepares the regular project releases and does some quality management. The maintainer also grants the CVS access permissions.

GNU Classpath has no formal hierarchy. The work is done by the most technically capable, and there is no strict work division either. All code changes are first posted to the discussion list as patches where they can be opposed if needed. The project typically receives between five and eight patches per day.

The GNU Classpath library code coverage progress can be tracked against OpenJDK6 and OpenJDK7.

== Virtual machine integration ==
GNU Classpath contains classes from the official Java API namespace. Where calls to native code are necessary or highly desired, this is done from a small number of "VM" classes. The name of such a VM class matches the name of the class requiring native methods, plus the additional VM prefix: java.lang.VMObject, java.lang.VMString and so on. VM classes, stored separately from the rest of code, are package private and final. The methods of these classes contain the keyword native, indicating the necessity of the supporting native library. Such libraries are provided by the authors of a Java virtual machine, hence GNU Classpath can be connected to nearly any Java virtual machine if the sources of such virtual machine are available and can be modified.

== Support for the new language features in Java 1.5 ==
Before version 0.95, each GNU Classpath release consisted of two separate release tarballs; one that represented the state of the main development branch and another that contained the contents of a more experimental branch, supporting the additions, such as generics, enumerations and annotations, present in Java 1.5.

Since version 0.95, Java 1.5 additions like generics have been fully integrated into the main branch. The branch can be built by using the Eclipse compiler, ecj, to compile Java 1.5 source code to bytecode. In the case of GCJ, it uses ecj to perform this initial stage, then converts the bytecode to native code. From 0.95 onwards, GNU Classpath also supports compiling and running the newly GPLed open-source javac compiler using GNU Classpath and also allows the GNU Classpath class library, tools and examples to be compiled with javac itself.

== Classes from the omg.org domain ==
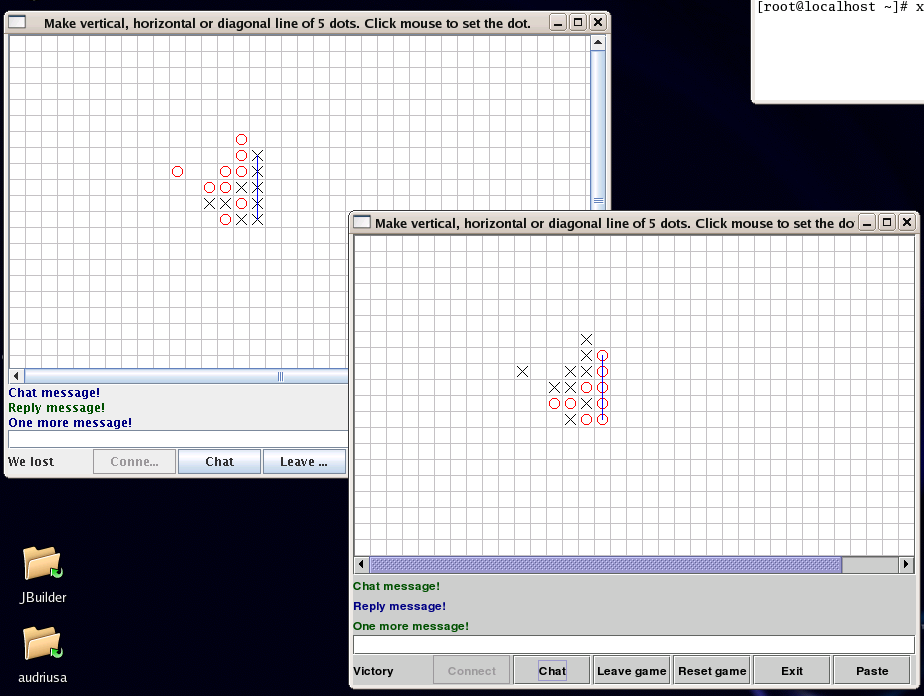
Sun and GNU CORBA interact in a two client game (Note: Fosdem 2006 included this and other demonstrations of data exchange between Sun's and Classpath implementations of CORBA. The source code is available in the Classpath repository.)

GNU Classpath does not accept any code that has a non-free license, or that was automatically generated from code with a non-free license. The standard Java API contains numerous classes from the omg.org domain that are normally generated from the IDL files, released by the Object Management Group. The "use, but no modify" license of these files counts as non-free. For this reason, the mentioned classes of CORBA in the GNU Classpath project (in org.omg.CORBA) were written from scratch, using only the official printed OMG specifications. Hence this part of GNU Classpath is as free as any other code in the project.

The org.omg packages were removed in Java 11.

== See also ==
- Apache Harmony
- GNU Compiler for Java
- IKVM
- JamVM
- JamaicaVM
- Jaos
- JikesRVM
- Kaffe
- IcedTea
- Free Java implementations
- Java Class Library
