= Mac OS Runtime for Java =

- Developer: Apple Inc.
- Stable release: MRJ 2.2.6 / April 8, 2004
- Operating system: classic Mac OS
- Type: Java virtual machine
- License: Apple SLA
- Website: docs.info.apple.com via WayBack machine

Mac OS Runtime for Java (MRJ, originally Macintosh Runtime for Java) was Apple's proprietary virtual machine for Java-based applications in the classic Mac OS (i.e. versions prior to Mac OS X). Both a runtime environment and a software development kit (SDK) are available.

The runtime environment includes a JIT compiler developed by Symantec, the standard Java class library from Sun, additional classes providing Macintosh-specific functionality, and the Apple Applet Runner (a lightweight application for running Java applets without the overhead of a web browser). A number of web browsers could use MRJ to run Java applets in web pages, including Microsoft Internet Explorer, iCab and HotJava.

The SDK includes ports of most of the tools from Sun's Java Development Kit (in the form of MPW tools and Macintosh applications), additional tools for packaging Java applications as double-clickable Macintosh applications, libraries for Macintosh-specific functionality, and documentation for the MRJ-specific classes and tools.

MRJ v2.2.5 was compatible with Sun's Java Development Kit version 1.1.8.

Since the transition to Mac OS X, Apple has discontinued MRJ and instead maintains and distributes a port of Oracle's HotSpot Java virtual machine. As of Java 7, Apple has discontinued its own JRE, and Java support on OS X/macOS now comes directly from Oracle.

== Implementations ==
- Java 1.0.2 with Mac OS Runtime for Java v 1.5.1 (starting with version 1.5, MRJ included a JIT compiler)
- Java 1.1.8 with Mac OS Runtime for Java v 2.2.6
