= Java Interface Definition Language =

In software development, Java Interface Definition Language, or Java IDL, is an implementation of the CORBA specification and enables interoperability and connectivity with heterogeneous objects. It is basically an Object Request Broker provided with JDK. The Java IDL enables distributed Web applications to transparently invoke operations on remote network services using the industry standards interface description language (IDL) and Internet InterORB Protocol IIOP from Object Management Group.
