= SableVM =

- Developer(s): Sable Research Group at McGill University
- Final release: 1.13 / March 30, 2007; 17 years ago
- Repository: sourceforge.net/projects/sablevm/files/
- Operating system: Cross-platform
- Type: Java Virtual Machine
- License: GNU Lesser General Public License
- Website: sablevm.org

SableVM was a clean room implementation of Java bytecode interpreter implementing the Java virtual machine (VM) specification, second edition. SableVM was designed to be a robust, extremely portable, efficient, and fully specifications-compliant (JVM spec, Java Native Interface, Invocation interface, Debug interface, etc.) Java Virtual Machine that would be easy to maintain and to extend. It is now no longer being maintained.

The implementation was a part of the effort in the early 2000s to break the Java ecosystem free from Sun Microsystems's control.

== Overview ==
The core engine is an interpreter which used ground-breaking techniques to deliver performance that can approach that of a "naive" just-in-time (JIT) compiler, while retaining the software engineering advantages of interpreters: portability, maintainability and simplicity. This simplicity makes SableVM's source code very accessible and easy to understand for new users/programmers.

SableVM is Free Software — it is licensed under the GNU Lesser General Public License (LGPL). It also makes use of GNU Classpath (copyrighted by the FSF) which is licensed under the GNU General Public License with linking exception.

SableVM is the first open-source virtual machine for Java to include the support for JVMDI (Java Virtual Machine Debugging Interface) and JDWP (Java Debug Wire Protocol). These standard Java debugging interfaces are used for example by Eclipse to provide a rich and user-friendly Java development environment.

== Java Intermediate Language ==
Some versions of the SableVM use Java Intermediate Language, an intermediate language (which is a subset of XML) representing the type structure of a Java program. The language was proposed by the team of SableVM in McGill University in January 2002 to aid the analysis of a Java program with the goals of scalability and good performance. The language has not been widely adopted.

Consider the following piece of Java code.

public MyClass implements MyInterface extends MySupperClass {
  int MyField;

  void MyMethod (double x, double y) {
    double z;
    z = x + y;
    this.MyField = z
  }
}

This piece can be expressed in the language, as follows:

<jil>
<class name="MyClass" extends="MySupperClass">
  <modifiers><modifier name="public" /></modifiers>
  <interfaces><interface name="myinterface" /></interfaces>
    
  <fields>
    <field name="MyField" type="int" />
  </fields>

  <methods>
    <method name="MyMethod" returntype="void">
    <parameters>
      <parameter name="x" type="double" />
      <parameter name="y" type="double" />
    </parameters>
    <locals>
      <local name="z" type="double" />
    </locals>
    <statements>
      <!-- Each statement is expressed by some intermediate format for
           code generator like three address code. In the below
           a language called baf is used. -->
      <baf>
        <![CDATA[
          $r2 = $r0 + $r1;
          this.MyField = (double) $r2;
        ]]>
        <!-- Here, we are assuming x is expressed as $r0, y $r1 and z $r2. -->
      </baf>
    </statements>
    </method>
  </methods>
</class>
</jil>

== See also ==
- List of Java virtual machines
- Free Java implementations
