= GPL linking exception =

License exception of GNU General Public License

A GPL linking exception modifies the GNU General Public License (GPL) in a way that enables software projects which provide library code to be "linked to" the programs that use them, without applying the full terms of the GPL to the using program. Linking is the technical process of connecting code in a library to the using code, to produce a single executable file. It is performed either at compile time or run-time in order to produce functional machine-readable code. The Free Software Foundation states that, without applying the linking exception, a program linked to GPL library code may only be distributed under a GPL-compatible license. This has not been explicitly tested in court, but linking violations have resulted in settlement. The license of the GNU Classpath project explicitly includes a statement to that effect.

Many free software libraries which are distributed under the GPL use an equivalent exception, although the wording of the exception varies. Notable projects include ERIKA Enterprise, GNU Guile, the run-time libraries of GNAT, GNU Classpath and the GCC Runtime Library Exception.

Compiler runtime libraries also often use this license modification or an equivalent one, e.g. the libgcc library in the GNU Compiler Collection, as well as all libraries of the Free Pascal project.

In 2007, Sun Microsystems released most of the source code to the class libraries for the Java SE and Java EE projects under version 2 of the GPL license plus the Classpath linking exception, and used the same license as one possible license for their enterprise server GlassFish and for their NetBeans Java IDE.

Version 3 of the GNU Lesser General Public License (LGPL) is likewise constructed as an exception to the GPL.

== The Classpath exception ==
The GNU Classpath project provides an example of the use of such a GPL linking exception. The GNU Classpath library uses the following license:

Classpath is distributed under the terms of the GNU General Public License with the following clarification and special exception.

Linking this library statically or dynamically with other modules is making a combined work based on this library. Thus, the terms and conditions of the GNU General Public License cover the whole combination.

As a special exception, the copyright holders of this library give you permission to link this library with independent modules to produce an executable, regardless of the license terms of these independent modules, and to copy and distribute the resulting executable under terms of your choice, provided that you also meet, for each linked independent module, the terms and conditions of the license of that module. An independent module is a module which is not derived from or based on this library. If you modify this library, you may extend this exception to your version of the library, but you are not obliged to do so. If you do not wish to do so, delete this exception statement from your version.

As such, it can be used to run, create and distribute a large class of applications and applets. When GNU Classpath is used unmodified as the core class library for a virtual machine, compiler for the Java language, or for a program written in the Java programming language, it does not affect the licensing for distributing those programs directly.

== The GNU Lesser General Public License ==
While version 2.1 of the LGPL was a standalone license, the current LGPL version 3 is based on a reference to the GPL.

Compared to the GNU Classpath license above, the LGPL formulates more requirements to the linking exception: licensees must allow modification of the portions of the library they use and reverse engineering (of their software and the library) for debugging such modifications.

== See also ==
- GNU General Public License § Linking and derived works
- Free-software licence
- GNAT Modified General Public License
- OpenSSL Exception
- Software using the GPL linking exception (category)
- GPL font exception
