= SwingLabs =

Sun open-source project

swingLabs
- Other names: SwingX
- Developer: Sun
- Final release: 1.6.5-1 / 27 Feb 2013
- Written in: Java
- Operating system: Cross-platform
- Type: Widget library
- License: LGPL
- Website: java.net/projects/swinglabs/

swingLabs is a discontinued open-source project developed by Sun Microsystems proposing extensions to the Java Swing GUI toolkit. Available components included:

- Sorting, filtering, highlighting for tables, trees, and lists
- Find/search
- Auto-completion
- Login/authentication framework
- TreeTable component
- Collapsible panel component
- Date picker component
- Tip of the day component

The aim of the project was to experiment new or enhanced GUI functionalities that are required by Rich client applications. It acted as a testbed for ideas related to client side technologies.

== Integration into Java API ==
Some successful project components were eventually incorporated into the core Swing toolkit for future Java versions, although API compatibility was not guaranteed. Examples of these are:

- The GroupLayout manager in Java SE 6.
- Incorporation of the SystemTray in Java SE 6.
- The new Desktop class in Java SE 6, which allows to launch easily associated applications registered on the native desktop, as for example : launching the user-default browser, launching the user-default mail client, launching a registered application to open, edit or print a specified file.

== Sub-projects ==
The swingLabs project was divided into several sub-projects. For example:

- swingX: Provides extensions to the Java Swing GUI toolkit.
- JDIC (JDesktop Integration Components): Aims to provide Java applications with seamless desktop integration without sacrificing platform independence.
- nimbus: A Look and feel using synth.
- swingLayout: Was the home of the GroupLayout manager before its inclusion in Java SE 6.
- JDNC: Contained components to simplify the development of Swing-based rich client Java applications. This project has been replaced by the Swing Application Framework (JSR 296).
- scenegraph: A library providing 2D Scene graph functionality to Java 2D, including Swing widgets. This library is used internally by the JavaFX Script language.
- PDFRenderer: A PDF viewing library written in pure Java.

== Project status ==
During the sunsetting of java.net in 2017, the public repository for SwingLabs was deleted, effectively terminating the SwingLabs project. Several repositories containing snapshots of the final development version of SwingLabs (1.6.6-SNAPSHOT) do exist.

== See also ==
- SwingWorker
- JavaFX
