= Java version history =

List of versions of the Java programming language

The Java language has undergone several changes since JDK 1.0 as well as a number of additions of classes and packages to the standard library. Since J2SE 1.4, the evolution of the Java language has been governed by the Java Community Process (JCP), which uses Java Specification Requests (JSRs) to propose and specify additions and changes to the Java platform. The language is specified by the Java Language Specification (JLS); changes to the JLS are managed under JSR 901. In September 2017, Mark Reinhold, chief architect of the Java Platform, proposed to change the release train to "one feature release every six months" rather than the then-current two-year schedule. This proposal took effect for all following versions, and is still the current release schedule.

In addition to the language changes, other changes have been made to the Java Class Library over the years, which has grown from a few hundred classes in JDK 1.0 to over three thousand in J2SE 5. Entire new APIs, such as Swing and Java2D, have been introduced, and a number of the original JDK 1.0 classes and methods have been deprecated, and very few APIs have been removed (at least one, for threading, in Java 22). Some programs allow the conversion of Java programs from one version of the Java platform to an older one (for example Java 5.0 backported to 1.4) (see Java backporting tools).

Regarding Oracle's Java SE support roadmap, Java SE 25 (LTS) is the latest version as of September 2025 (and Java 26 a later released version) while versions 21, 17, 11 and 8 are the other still supported (long-term support − LTS) versions, where Oracle customers will receive Oracle Premier Support. Oracle continues to release no-cost public Java 8 updates for development and personal use indefinitely.

In the case of OpenJDK, both commercial long-term support and free software updates are available from multiple organizations in the broader community.

Java 27 was released on 15 September 2026 and Java 25 LTS was released on 16 September 2025.

== Release table ==
Java version overview
Version	Type	Class file format version	Release date	End of public updates (free)	End of extended support (paid)
JDK 1.0		45	January 23, 1996	May 1996	—N/a
JDK 1.1		45	February 18, 1997	October 2002	—N/a
J2SE 1.2		46	December 4, 1998	November 2003	—N/a
J2SE 1.3		47	May 8, 2000	March 2006	—N/a
J2SE 1.4		48	February 13, 2002	October 2008	—N/a
J2SE 5.0 (1.5)		49	September 30, 2004	October 2009	—N/a
Java SE 6 (1.6)		50	December 11, 2006	April 2013 for Oracle; December 2018 for Azul	December 2016 for Red Hat; October 2018 for Oracle; December 2027 for Azul; March 2028 for BellSoft Liberica
Java SE 7 (1.7)		51	July 28, 2011	July 2015 for Oracle; July 2022 for Azul; September 2022 for IBM Java SDK	June 2020 for Red Hat; July 2022 for Oracle; December 2027 for Azul; March 2028 for BellSoft Liberica
Java SE 8 (1.8)	LTS	52	March 18, 2014	April 2019 for Oracle; November 2026 for Red Hat; November 2026 for Azul; November 2026 for IBM Semeru Runtimes; December 2030 for Eclipse Temurin; December 2030 for Amazon Corretto; December 2030 for IBM Java SDK	December 2030 for Oracle; December 2030 for Azul; March 2031 for BellSoft Liberica
Java SE 9 (1.9)		53	September 21, 2017	March 2018	—N/a
Java SE 10 (1.10)		54	March 20, 2018	September 2018	—N/a
Java SE 11	LTS	55	September 25, 2018	April 2019 for Oracle; September 2027 for Microsoft Build of OpenJDK; October 2024 for Red Hat; October 2027 for Eclipse Temurin; October 2027 for IBM Semeru Runtimes; January 2032 for Amazon Corretto; January 2032 for Azul	January 2032 for Azul; March 2032 for BellSoft Liberica; October 2027 for Red Hat; January 2032 for Oracle
Java SE 12		56	March 19, 2019	September 2019	—N/a
Java SE 13		57	September 17, 2019	March 2020	—N/a
Java SE 14		58	March 17, 2020	September 2020	—N/a
Java SE 15		59	September 16, 2020	March 2021	—N/a
Java SE 16		60	March 16, 2021	September 2021	—N/a
Java SE 17	LTS	61	September 14, 2021	September 2024 for Oracle; September 2027 for Microsoft Build of OpenJDK; October 2027 for Eclipse Temurin; October 2027 for Red Hat; October 2027 for IBM Semeru Runtimes; October 2029 for Amazon Corretto; September 2029 for Azul	September 2029 for Oracle; March 2030 for BellSoft Liberica
Java SE 18		62	March 22, 2022	September 2022	—N/a
Java SE 19		63	September 20, 2022	March 2023	—N/a
Java SE 20		64	March 21, 2023	September 2023	—N/a
Java SE 21	LTS	65	September 19, 2023	September 2028 for Oracle; September 2028 for Microsoft Build of OpenJDK; December 2029 for Red Hat; December 2029 for Eclipse Temurin; December 2029 for IBM Semeru Runtimes; October 2030 for Amazon Corretto; September 2031 for Azul	September 2031 for Oracle; March 2032 for BellSoft Liberica
Java SE 22		66	March 19, 2024	September 2024	—N/a
Java SE 23		67	September 17, 2024	March 2025 for Oracle; March 2025 for Azul; March 2025 for IBM Semeru Runtimes	—N/a
Java SE 24		68	March 18, 2025	September 2025	—N/a
Java SE 25	LTS	69	September 16, 2025	September 2030 for Oracle; September 2031 for Eclipse Temurin; September 2033 for Azul; July 2032 for Amazon Corretto	September 2033 for Oracle; March 2034 for BellSoft Liberica
Java SE 26		70	March 17, 2026	September 2026 for Oracle; September 2026 for Eclipse Temurin; October 2026 for Amazon Corretto	—N/a
Java SE 27		71	September 15, 2026	March 2027	—N/a
Java SE 28		72	March 23, 2027	September 2027	—N/a
Java SE 29	LTS	73	September 21, 2027	September 2032	September 2035 for Oracle
Java SE 30		74	March 21, 2028	September 2028	—N/a
Legend: Unsupported Supported Latest version Future version

== JDK 1.0 ==
JDK 1.0
- Released: 23 January 1996 (30 years ago)

The first version was released on January 23, 1996. The first stable version, JDK 1.0.2, is called Java 1.

It included:

- core language features (basic java types in java.lang, and utility classes in java.util)
- support for graphics (AWT framework)
- support for creating a Java applet
- libraries for I/O and networking

== JDK 1.1 ==
JDK 1.1
- Released: 19 February 1997 (29 years ago)

Major additions in the release on February 19, 1997 included:

- extensive retooling of the Abstract Window Toolkit (AWT) event model
- inner classes added to the language
- JavaBeans
- Java Database Connectivity (JDBC) and support for sql
- Java remote method invocation (RMI) and serialization
- reflection which supported Introspection only, no modification at runtime was possible. (The ability to modify objects reflectively was added in J2SE 1.2, by introducing the AccessibleObject class and its subclasses such as the Field class.)
- Just-in-time compilation (JIT) on Microsoft Windows platforms, produced for JavaSoft by Symantec
- Internationalization and Unicode support originating from Taligent

== J2SE 1.2 ==
J2SE 1.2
- Codename: Playground
- Released: 8 December 1998 (27 years ago)

The release on December 8, 1998 and subsequent releases through J2SE 5.0 were rebranded retrospectively Java 2 and the version name "J2SE" (Java 2 Platform, Standard Edition) replaced JDK to distinguish the base platform from J2EE (Java 2 Platform, Enterprise Edition) and J2ME (Java 2 Platform, Micro Edition). This was a significant release of Java as it tripled the size of the Java platform to 1520 classes in 59 packages. Major additions included:

- strictfp keyword (by JVM 17 an obsolete keyword, should not be used in new code)
- The Swing graphical API was integrated into the core classes.
- Sun's JVM was equipped with a JIT compiler for the first time.
- Java plug-in
- Java IDL, an IDL implementation for CORBA interoperability
- Collections framework

== J2SE 1.3 ==
J2SE 1.3
- Codename: Kestrel
- Released: 8 May 2000 (26 years ago)

The most notable changes in the May 8, 2000 release were:

- HotSpot JVM included (the HotSpot JVM was first released in April 1999 for the J2SE 1.2 JVM)
- RMI was modified to support optional compatibility with CORBA.
- Java Naming and Directory Interface (JNDI) included in core libraries (previously available as an extension)
- Java Platform Debugger Architecture (JPDA)
- JavaSound
- Synthetic proxy classes

Java 1.3 is the last release of Java to officially support Microsoft Windows 95.

== J2SE 1.4 ==
J2SE 1.4
- Codename: Merlin
- Released: 6 February 2002 (24 years ago)

Support ended
- Public: October 2008
- Paid: February 2013

The February 6, 2002 release was the first release of the Java platform developed under the Java Community Process as JSR 59. Major changes included:

- Language changes
  - assert keyword (specified in JSR 41)
- Library improvements
  - Regular expressions modeled after Perl regular expressions
  - Exception chaining allows an exception to encapsulate original lower-level exception
  - Internet Protocol version 6 (IPv6) support
  - Non-blocking I/O (named NIO) (specified in JSR 51)
  - Logging API (specified in JSR 47)
  - Image I/O API for reading and writing images in formats like JPEG and PNG
  - Integrated XML parser and XSLT processor (JAXP) (specified in JSR 5 and JSR 63)
  - Integrated security and cryptography extensions (JCE, JSSE, JAAS)
  - Java Web Start included (Java Web Start was first released in March 2001 for J2SE 1.3) (specified in JSR 56)
  - Preferences API (java.util.prefs)

Public support and security updates for Java 1.4 ended in October 2008. Paid security updates for Oracle customers ended in February 2013.

== Java SE 5 ==
Java SE 5
- Codename: Tiger
- Released: 30 September 2004 (22 years ago)

Support ended
- Public: November 2009
- Paid: April 2015

The release on September 30, 2004 was originally numbered 1.5, which is still used as the internal version number. The number was changed to "better reflect the level of maturity, stability, scalability and security of the J2SE". This version was developed under JSR 176.

Java SE 5 entered its end-of-public-updates period on April 8, 2008; updates are no longer available to the public as of November 3, 2009. Updates were available to paid Oracle customers until May 2015.

Tiger added a number of significant new language features:

- Generics: provides compile-time (static) type safety for collections and eliminates the need for most typecasts (type conversion) (specified by JSR 14)
- Metadata: also called annotations; allows language constructs such as classes and methods to be tagged with additional data, which can then be processed by metadata-aware utilities (specified by JSR 175)
- Autoboxing/unboxing: automatic conversions between primitive types (such as int) and primitive wrapper classes (such as Integer) (specified by JSR 201)
- Enumerations: the enum keyword creates a typesafe, ordered list of values (such as Day.MONDAY, Day.TUESDAY, etc.); previously this could only be achieved by non-typesafe constant integers or manually constructed classes (typesafe enum pattern) (specified by JSR 201)
- Varargs: the last parameter of a method can now be declared using a type name followed by three dots (e.g. void drawtext(String... lines)); in the calling code any number of parameters of that type can be used and they are then placed in an array to be passed to the method, or alternatively the calling code can pass an array of that type
- Enhanced for each loop: the for loop syntax is extended with special syntax for iterating over each member of either an array or any Iterable, such as the standard Collection classes (specified by JSR 201)
- Improved semantics of execution for multi-threaded Java programs; the new Java memory model addresses issues of complexity, effectiveness, and performance of previous specifications
- Static imports

There were also the following improvements to the standard libraries:

- Automatic stub generation for RMI objects
- Swing: New skinnable look and feel, called synth
- The concurrency utilities in package java.util.concurrent
- Scanner class for parsing data from various input streams and buffers

Java 5 is the last release of Java to officially support Microsoft Windows 98 and Windows ME, while Windows Vista was the newest version of Windows that Java SE 5 was supported on prior to Java 5 going end-of-life in October 2009.

Java 5 Update 5 (1.5.0_05) is the last release of Java to work on Windows 95 (with Internet Explorer 5.5 installed) and Windows NT 4.0.

Java 5 was first available on Apple Mac OS X 10.4 (Tiger) and was the default version of Java installed on Apple Mac OS X 10.5 (Leopard).

Public support and security updates for Java 1.5 ended in November 2009. Paid security updates for Oracle customers ended in April 2015.

=== Versioning change ===
This version introduced a new versioning system for the Java language, although the old versioning system continued to be used for developer libraries:

Both version numbers "1.5.0" and "5.0" are used to identify this release of the Java 2 Platform Standard Edition. Version "5.0" is the product version, while "1.5.0" is the developer version. The number "5.0" is used to better reflect the level of maturity, stability, scalability and security of the J2SE.

— "Version 1.5.0 or 5.0?", Java release notes

This correspondence continued through later releases (Java 6 = JDK 1.6, Java 7 = JDK 1.7, and so on).

== Java SE 6 ==
Java SE 6
- Codename: Mustang
- Released: 11 November 2006 (20 years ago)

Support ended
- Public: February 2013

As of the version released on December 11, 2006, Sun replaced the name "J2SE" with Java SE and dropped the ".0" from the version number. Internal numbering for developers remains 1.6.0.

This version was developed under JSR 270.

During the development phase, new builds including enhancements and bug fixes were released approximately weekly. Beta versions were released in February and June 2006, leading up to a final release that occurred on December 11, 2006.

Major changes included in this version:

- Support for older Win9x versions dropped; unofficially, Java 6 Update 7 was the last release of Java shown to work on these versions of Windows. This is believed to be due to the major changes in Update 10.
- Scripting Language Support (JSR 223): Generic API for tight integration with scripting languages, and built-in Mozilla JavaScript Rhino integration.
- Dramatic performance improvements for the core platform, and Swing.
- Improved Web Service support through JAX-WS (JSR 224).
- JDBC 4.0 support (JSR 221).
- Java Compiler API (JSR 199): an API allowing a Java program to select and invoke a Java Compiler programmatically.
- Upgrade of JAXB to version 2.0: Including integration of a StAX parser.
- Support for pluggable annotations (JSR 269).
- Many GUI improvements, such as integration of SwingWorker in the API, table sorting and filtering, and true Swing double-buffering (eliminating the gray-area effect).
- JVM improvements include: synchronization and compiler performance optimizations, new algorithms and upgrades to existing garbage collection algorithms, and application start-up performance.

Java 6 can be installed to Mac OS X 10.5 (Leopard) running on 64-bit (Core 2 Duo and higher) processor machines. Java 6 is also supported by both 32-bit and 64-bit machines running Mac OS X 10.6 (Snow Leopard).

Java 6 reached the end of its supported life in February 2013, at which time all public updates, including security updates, were scheduled to be stopped. Oracle released two more updates to Java 6 in March and April 2013, which patched some security vulnerabilities.

=== Java 6 updates ===
After Java 6 release, Sun, and later Oracle, released several updates which, while not changing any public API, enhanced end-user usability or fixed bugs.

Table of Java 6 updates
Release	Release date	Highlights
Java SE 6	2006-12-23	This release adds multiple enhancements in the fields of Web services, scripting, databases, pluggable annotations, and security, as well as quality, compatibility, and stability. JConsole is now officially supported. Java DB support has been added.
Java SE 6 Update 1	2007-05-07	
Java SE 6 Update 2	2007-07-03	
Java SE 6 Update 3	2007-10-03	
Java SE 6 Update 4	2008-01-14	HotSpot VM 10
Java SE 6 Update 5	2008-03-05	Several security flaws were eliminated. New root certificates from AOL, DigiCert, and TrustCenter are now included.
Java SE 6 Update 6	2008-04-16	A workaround for the infamous Xlib/XCB locking assertion issue was introduced. A memory leak when using Kerberos authentication with LoginContext was fixed. Several other bugs were fixed.
Java SE 6 Update 7		Unofficially, Java SE 6 Update 7 (1.6.0.7) is the last version of Java that was shown to be working on the Win9x family of operating systems
Java SE 6 Update 10	2008-10-15	HotSpot VM 11. Major changes for this update include: Java Deployment Toolkit, a set of JavaScript functions to ease the deployment of applets and Java Web Start applications.; Java Kernel, a small installer including only the most commonly used JRE classes. Other packages are downloaded when needed.; Enhanced updater.; Enhanced versioning and pack200 support: server-side support is no longer required.; Java Quick Starter, to improve cold start-up time.; Improved performance of Java2D graphics primitives on Windows, using Direct3D and hardware acceleration.; A new Swing look and feel called Nimbus and based on synth.; Next-Generation Java Plug-In: applets now run in a separate process and support a number of features of Web Start applications.
Java SE 6 Update 11	2008-12-03	13 security fixes
Java SE 6 Update 12	2008-12-12	No security fixes; 64-bit Java plug-in (for 64-bit web browsers only); Windows Server 2008 support; performance improvements of graphics and JavaFX applications
Java SE 6 Update 13	2009-03-24	7 security fixes, JNDI store and retrieve Java objects in LDAP slightly modified, JMX Change (createMBeanunregisterMBean), 4 new root certificates added
Java SE 6 Update 14	2009-05-28	HotSpot VM 14. This release includes extensive performance updates to the JIT compiler, compressed pointers for 64-bit machines, as well as experimental support for the Garbage-First (G1) a low-pause Garbage Collector. The -XX:+DoEscapeAnalysis option directs the HotSpot JIT compiler to use escape analysis to determine whether local objects can be allocated on the stack instead of the heap. Some developers have noticed an issue introduced in this release which causes debuggers to miss breakpoints seemingly randomly. Sun has a corresponding bug, which is tracking the issue. The workaround applies to the Client and Server VMs. Using the -XX:+UseParallelGC option will prevent the failure. Another workaround is to roll back to update 13, or to upgrade to update 16.
Java SE 6 Update 15	2009-08-04	Introduced patch-in-place functionality
Java SE 6 Update 16	2009-08-11	Fixed the issue introduced in update 14 which caused debuggers to miss breakpoints
Java SE 6 Update 17	2009-11-04	Security fixes; two new root certificates
Java SE 6 Update 18	2010-01-13	No security fixes; Hotspot VM 16; support for Ubuntu 8.04 LTS Desktop Edition, SLES 11, Windows 7, Red Hat Enterprise Linux 5.3, Firefox 3.6, VisualVM 1.2; updated Java DB; multiple performance improvements
Java SE 6 Update 19	2010-03-30	Security fixes; root certificate changes: seven new, three removed, five replaced with stronger signature algorithms; interim fix for TLS renegotiation attack
Java SE 6 Update 20	2010-04-15	2 security fixes
Java SE 6 Update 21	2010-07-07	No security fixes; Hotspot VM 17; support for Red Hat Enterprise Linux 5.4 and 5.5, Oracle Enterprise Linux 4.8, 5.4, 5.5; Google Chrome 4 support; support for Customized Loading Progress Indicators; VisualVM 1.2.2
Java SE 6 Update 22	2010-10-12	29 security fixes; RFC 5746 support
Java SE 6 Update 23	2010-12-08	No security fixes; Hotspot VM 19; better support for right-to-left languages
Java SE 6 Update 24	2011-02-15	21 security fixes; updated Java DB
Java SE 6 Update 25	2011-03-21	No security fixes; Hotspot VM 20; support for Internet Explorer 9, Firefox 4 and Chrome 10; improved BigDecimal; includes "tiered" compilation in the Server VM that enables it to start quickly as does the Client VM, while achieving better peak performance (this feature is enabled by specifying -server and -XX:+TieredCompilation command options)
Java SE 6 Update 26	2011-06-07	17 new security fixes; last version compatible with Windows Vista SP1
Java SE 6 Update 27	2011-08-16	No security fixes; certification for Firefox 5
Java SE 6 Update 29	2011-10-18	20 security fixes, various bug fixes
Java SE 6 Update 30	2011-12-12	No security fixes; fix for SSL regression in Update 29; support for Red Hat Enterprise Linux 6
Java SE 6 Update 31	2012-02-14	14 security fixes and one bug fix; last version work reliably for Windows 2000
Java SE 6 Update 32	2012-04-26	No security fixes, various bug fixes
Java SE 6 Update 33	2012-06-12	14 security fixes, improved VM configuration file loading
Java SE 6 Update 34	2012-08-14	No security fixes, various bug fixes
Java SE 6 Update 35	2012-08-30	Contains a security-in-depth fix
Java SE 6 Update 37	2012-10-16	30 security fixes
Java SE 6 Update 38	2012-12-11	Various bug fixes
Java SE 6 Update 39	2013-02-01	50 security fixes
Java SE 6 Update 41	2013-02-19	5 security fixes
Java SE 6 Update 43	2013-03-04	2 security fixes
Java SE 6 Update 45	2013-04-16	42 security fixes; other changes; final public update.
Java SE 6 Update 51	2013-06-18	Not available publicly, only available through the Java SE Support program and in Apple Update for OS X Snow Leopard, Lion & Mountain Lion; up to 40 security fixes
Java SE 6 Update 65	2013-10-15	Not available publicly, only available through the Java SE Support program and in Apple Update for OS X Snow Leopard, Lion & Mountain Lion; at least 11 critical security fixes
Java SE 6 Update 71	2014-01-14	Not available for public download; 33 fixes
Java SE 6 Update 75	2014-04-15	Not available publicly, only available through the Java SE Support program and in Solaris 10's Recommended Patchset Cluster no. #54; 25 security fixes
Java SE 6 Update 81	2014-07-15	Not available publicly, only available through the Java SE Support program and in Solaris 10's Recommended Patchset Cluster; 11 security fixes
Java SE 6 Update 85	2014-10-16	Not available publicly, only available through the Java SE Support program and in Solaris 10's Recommended Patchset Cluster; 18 security fixes
Java SE 6 Update 91	2015-01-21	Linux x64 and Windows i586 versions are available as the Java SE 6 Reference Implementation. Other versions are only available through the Java SE Support program and in Solaris 10's Recommended Patchset Cluster; 15 security fixes
Java SE 6 Update 95	2015-04-14	Not available publicly, only available through the Java SE Support program and in Solaris 10's Recommended Patchset Cluster; 14 security fixes
Java SE 6 Update 101	2015-07-15	Not available publicly, only available through the Java SE Support program and in Solaris 10's Recommended Patchset Cluster; 18 security fixes Certification for IE 10 and 11 was introduced in 1.6.0_101
Java SE 6 Update 105	2015-10-20	Not available publicly, only available through the Java SE Support program and in Solaris 10's Recommended Patchset Cluster; 17 security fixes
Java SE 6 Update 111	2016-01-20	Not available publicly, only available through the Java SE Support program and in Solaris 10's Recommended Patchset Cluster; 13 security fixes
Java SE 6 Update 113	2016-02-05	Not available publicly, only available through the Java SE Support program and in Solaris 10's Recommended Patchset Cluster; 1 security fix
Java SE 6 Update 115	2016-04-21	Not available publicly, only available through the Java SE Support program and in Solaris 10's Recommended Patchset Cluster; 8 security fixes
Java SE 6 Update 121	2016-07-19	Not available publicly, only available through the Java SE Support program and in Solaris 10's Recommended Patchset Cluster; 15 security fixes
Java SE 6 Update 131	2016-10-18	Not available publicly, only available through the Java SE Support program and in Solaris 10's Recommended Patchset Cluster; 13 security fixes
Java SE 6 Update 141	2017-01-17	Not available publicly, only available through the Java SE Support program and in Solaris 10's Recommended Patchset Cluster; 17 security fixes
Java SE 6 Update 151	2017-04-18	Not available publicly, only available through the Java SE Support program and in Solaris 10's Recommended Patchset Cluster; 10 security fixes
Java SE 6 Update 161	2017-07-18	Not available publicly, only available through the Java SE Support program and in Solaris 10's Recommended Patchset Cluster; 5 security fixes
Java SE 6 Update 171	2017-10-20	Not available publicly, only available through the Java SE Support program and in Solaris 10's Recommended Patchset Cluster; 7 security fixes
Java SE 6 Update 181	2018-01-16	Not available publicly, only available through the Java SE Support program and in Solaris 10's Recommended Patchset Cluster; 12 security fixes
Java SE 6 Update 191	2018-04-17	Not available publicly, only available through the Java SE Support program and in Solaris 10's Recommended Patchset Cluster; 7 security fixes
Java SE 6 Update 201	2018-07-17	Not available publicly, only available through the Java SE Support program and in Solaris 10's Recommended Patchset Cluster; 3 security fixes
Java SE 6 Update 211	2018-10-18	Not available publicly, only available through the Java SE Support program and in Solaris 10's Recommended Patchset Cluster; 8 security fixes

== Java SE 7 ==
Java SE 7
- Codename: Dolphin
- Released: 28 July 2011 (15 years ago)

Support ended
- Public: April 2015
- Paid: June 2022

Java 7 was a major update that launched on July 7, 2011 and was made available for developers on July 28, 2011. The development period was organized into thirteen milestones; on June 6, 2011, the last of the thirteen milestones was finished. On average, 8 builds (which generally included enhancements and bug fixes) were released per milestone. The feature list at the OpenJDK 7 project lists many of the changes.

Additions in Java 7 include:

- JVM support for dynamic languages, with the new invokedynamic bytecode under JSR-292, following the prototyping work currently done on the Multi Language Virtual Machine
- Compressed 64-bit pointers (available in Java 6 with -XX:+UseCompressedOops)
- Project Coin language features:

- Strings in switch
- Automatic resource management in try-statement aka try-with-resources statement
- Improved type inference for generic instance creation, aka the diamond operator <>
- Simplified varargs method declaration
- Binary integer literals
- Allowing underscores in numeric literals
- Catching multiple exception types and rethrowing exceptions with improved type checking

- Concurrency utilities under JSR 166
- New file I/O library (defined by JSR 203) adding support for multiple file systems, file metadata and symbolic links. The new packages are java.nio.file, java.nio.file.attribute and java.nio.file.spi
- Timsort is used to sort collections and arrays of objects instead of merge sort
- Library-level support for elliptic curve cryptography algorithms
- An XRender pipeline for Java 2D, which improves handling of features specific to modern GPUs
- New platform APIs for the graphics features originally implemented in version 6u10 as unsupported APIs
- Enhanced library-level support for new network protocols, including SCTP and Sockets Direct Protocol
- Upstream updates to XML and Unicode
- Java deployment rule sets

Lambda (Java's implementation of lambda functions), Jigsaw (Java's implementation of modules), and part of Coin were dropped from Java 7, and released as part of Java 8 (except for Jigsaw, which was released in Java 9).

Java 7 was the default version to download on java.com from April 2012 until Java 8 was released.

=== Java 7 updates ===
Oracle issued public updates to the Java 7 family on a quarterly basis until April 2015 when the product reached the end of its public availability. Further updates for JDK 7, which continued until July 2022, are only made available to customers with a support contract.

Table of Java 7 updates
Release	Release date	Highlights
Java SE 7	2011-07-28	Initial release; HotSpot VM 21
Java SE 7 Update 1	2011-10-18	20 security fixes, other bug fixes
Java SE 7 Update 2	2011-12-12	No security fixes; HotSpot VM 22; reliability and performance improvements; support for Solaris 11 and Firefox 5 and later; JavaFX included with Java SE JDK, improvements for web-deployed applications
Java SE 7 Update 3	2012-02-14	14 security fixes
Java SE 7 Update 4	2012-04-26	No security updates; HotSpot VM 23; JDK Support for Mac OS X; New Supported Garbage Collector: Garbage-First (G1)
Java SE 7 Update 5	2012-06-12	14 security fixes
Java SE 7 Update 6	2012-08-14	JavaFX and Java Access Bridge included in Java SE JDK and JRE installation, JavaFX support for touch-enabled monitors and touch pads, JavaFX support for Linux, JDK and JRE Support for Mac OS X, JDK for Linux on ARM
Java SE 7 Update 7	2012-08-30	4 security fixes
Java SE 7 Update 9	2012-10-16	30 security vulnerabilities fixes
Java SE 7 Update 10	2012-12-11	New security features, such as the ability to disable any Java application from running in the browser and new dialogs to warn you when the JRE is insecure, and bug fixes
Java SE 7 Update 11	2013-01-13	Olson Data 2012i; bugfix for problems with registration of plugin on systems with Stand-alone version of JavaFX Installed, security fixes for CVE-2013-0422; the default security level for Java applets and web start applications has been increased from "Medium" to "High"
Java SE 7 Update 13	2013-02-01	50 security fixes
Java SE 7 Update 15	2013-02-19	5 security fixes
Java SE 7 Update 17	2013-03-04	2 security fixes
Java SE 7 Update 21	2013-04-16	Multiple changes including 42 security fixes, a new Server JRE that does not include the plug-in, and the JDK for Linux on ARM
Java SE 7 Update 25	2013-06-18	Multiple changes including 40 security fixes
Java SE 7 Update 40	2013-09-10	621 bug fixes, New security features, hardfloat ARM, Java Mission Control 5.2 and Retina Display support
Java SE 7 Update 45	2013-10-15	51 security fixes; protections against unauthorized redistribution of Java applications; restore security prompts; JAXP changes; TimeZone.setDefault change
Java SE 7 Update 51	2014-01-14	36 security fixes; block JAVA applets without manifest (like Remote console—Java Applet—IBM IMM card, HP iLO card) even if warning dialog is with sentence "will be blocked in next version", 17 bug fixes
Java SE 7 Update 55	2014-04-15	37 security fixes, 19 bug fixes
Java SE 7 Update 60	2014-05-28	Java Mission Control 5.3, 130 bug fixes
Java SE 7 Update 65	2014-07-15	18 bug fixes
Java SE 7 Update 67	2014-08-04	1 bug fix
Java SE 7 Update 71	2014-10-14	16 bug fixes
Java SE 7 Update 72	2014-10-14	Same release date with Update 71 as a corresponding Patch Set Update (PSU) for Java SE 7, 36 bug fixes
Java SE 7 Update 75	2015-01-20	12 bug fixes, SSLv3 disabled by default
Java SE 7 Update 76	2015-01-20	Same release date with Update 75 as a corresponding Patch Set Update (PSU) for Java SE 7, 97 bug fixes
Java SE 7 Update 79	2015-04-14	21 security fixes, 6 bug fixes,
Java SE 7 Update 80	2015-04-14	Last public release of Java 7; same release date with Update 79 as a corresponding Patch Set Update (PSU) for Java SE 7, 104 bug fixes
Java SE 7 Update 85	2015-07-15	Not available publicly, only available through the Java SE Support program and in Solaris 10's Recommended Patchset Cluster; 25 security fixes
Java SE 7 Update 91	2015-10-20	Not available publicly, only available through the Java SE Support program and in Solaris 10's Recommended Patchset Cluster; 20 security fixes
Java SE 7 Update 95	2016-01-19	Not available publicly, only available through the Java SE Support program and in Solaris 10's Recommended Patchset Cluster; 8 security fixes
Java SE 7 Update 97	2016-02-05	Not available publicly, only available through the Java SE Support program and in Solaris 10's Recommended Patchset Cluster; 1 security fix
Java SE 7 Update 99	2016-03-23	Not available publicly, only available through the Java SE Support program and in Solaris 10's Recommended Patchset Cluster; 1 security fix
Java SE 7 Update 101	2016-04-18	Not available publicly, only available through the Java SE Support program and in Solaris 10's Recommended Patchset Cluster; 22 security fixes
Java SE 7 Update 111	2016-07-19	Not available publicly, only available through the Java SE Support program and in Solaris 10's Recommended Patchset Cluster; 36 security fixes
Java SE 7 Update 121	2016-10-18	Not available publicly, only available through the Java SE Support program and in Solaris 10's Recommended Patchset Cluster; 32 security fixes
Java SE 7 Update 131	2017-01-17	Not available publicly, only available through the Java SE Support program and in Solaris 10's Recommended Patchset Cluster; 34 security fixes
Java SE 7 Update 141	2017-04-18	Not available publicly, only available through the Java SE Support program and in Solaris 10's Recommended Patchset Cluster; 8 security fixes
Java SE 7 Update 151	2017-07-18	Not available publicly, only available through the Java SE Support program and in Solaris 10's Recommended Patchset Cluster; 4 security fixes
Java SE 7 Update 161	2017-10-20	Not available publicly, only available through the Java SE Support program and in Solaris 10's Recommended Patchset Cluster; 4 security fixes
Java SE 7 Update 171	2018-01-16	Not available publicly, only available through the Java SE Support program and in Solaris 10's Recommended Patchset Cluster; 51 security fixes
Java SE 7 Update 181	2018-04-17	Not available publicly, only available through the Java SE Support program and in Solaris 10's Recommended Patchset Cluster; 12 security fixes
Java SE 7 Update 191	2018-07-17	Not available publicly, only available through the Java SE Support program and in Solaris 10's Recommended Patchset Cluster; 9 security fixes
Java SE 7 Update 201	2018-10-18	Not available publicly, only available through the Java SE Support program and in Solaris 10's Recommended Patchset Cluster; 13 security fixes
Java SE 7 Update 211	2019-01-15	Not available publicly, only available through the Java SE Support program and in Solaris 10's Recommended Patchset Cluster; 5 security fixes
Java SE 7 Update 221	2019-04-16	Not available publicly, only available through the Java SE Support program and in Solaris 10's Recommended Patchset Cluster; 5 security fixes
Java SE 7 Update 231	2019-07-16	Not available publicly, only available through the Java SE Support program and in Solaris 10's Recommended Patchset Cluster; 6 security fixes
Java SE 7 Update 241	2019-10-15	Not available publicly, only available through the Java SE Support program and in Solaris 10's Recommended Patchset Cluster; 15 security fixes
Java SE 7 Update 251	2020-01-14	Not available publicly, only available through the Java SE Support program and in Solaris 10's Recommended Patchset Cluster; 12 security fixes
Java SE 7 Update 261	2020-04-14	Not available publicly, only available through the Java SE Support program and in Solaris 10's Recommended Patchset Cluster; 15 security fixes
Java SE 7 Update 271	2020-07-14	Not available publicly, only available through the Java SE Support program and in Solaris 10's Recommended Patchset Cluster; 11 security fixes
Java SE 7 Update 281	2020-10-20	Not available publicly, only available through the Java SE Support program and in Solaris 10's Recommended Patchset Cluster; 8 security fixes
Java SE 7 Update 291	2021-01-19	Not available publicly, only available through the Java SE Support program and in Solaris 10's Recommended Patchset Cluster; 1 security fixes
Java SE 7 Update 301	2021-04-12	Not available publicly, only available through the Java SE Support program and in Solaris 10's Recommended Patchset Cluster; 11 security fixes
Java SE 7 Update 311	2021-07-20	Not available publicly, only available through the Java SE Support program and in Solaris 10's Recommended Patchset Cluster; 24 bug fixes
Java SE 7 Update 321	2021-10-19	Not available publicly, only available through the Java SE Support program and in Solaris 10's Recommended Patchset Cluster; 16 bug fixes
Java SE 7 Update 331	2022-01-18	Not available publicly, only available through the Java SE Support program and in Solaris 10's Recommended Patchset Cluster; 18 bug fixes

== Java SE 8 (LTS) ==
Java SE 8
- LTS version
- Codename: Spider
- Released: 18 March 2014 (12 years ago)
- # of JEPs: 8

Java 8 was released on 18 March 2014, and included some features that were planned for Java 7 but later deferred.

Work on features was organized in terms of JDK Enhancement Proposals (JEPs).

- JSR 335, JEP 126: Language-level support for lambda expressions (officially, lambda expressions; unofficially, closures) under Project Lambda and default methods (virtual extension methods) which can be used to add methods to interfaces without breaking existing implementations. There was an ongoing debate in the Java community on whether to add support for lambda expressions. Sun later declared that lambda expressions would be included in Java and asked for community input to refine the feature. Supporting lambda expressions also enables functional-style operations on streams of elements, such as MapReduce-inspired transformations on collections. Default methods can be used by an author of an API to add new methods to an interface without breaking the old code using it. Although it was not their primary intent, default methods can also be used for multiple inheritance of behavior (but not state).
- JEP 174: Project Nashorn, a JavaScript runtime which can run JavaScript code embedded within applications
- JEP 104: Annotation on Java types
- Unsigned integer arithmetic
- JEP 120: Repeating annotations
- JEP 150: Date and time API
- JEP 178: Statically-linked JNI libraries
- JEP 153: Launch JavaFX applications (direct launching of JavaFX application JARs)
- JEP 122: Remove the permanent generation

Java 8 is not supported on Windows XP but as of JDK 8 update 25, it can still be installed and run under Windows XP. Previous updates of JDK 8 could be run under XP by downloading archived zip format file and unzipping it for the executable. The last version of Java 8 that could run on XP is update 251.

From October 2014, Java 8 was the default version to download (and then again the download replacing Java 9) from the official website. "Oracle will continue to provide Public Updates and auto updates of Java SE 8, Indefinitely for Personal Users".

=== Java 8 updates ===
Table of Java 8 updates
Release	Release date	Highlights
Java SE 8	2014-03-18	Initial release
Java SE 8 Update 5	2014-04-15	Using "*" in Caller-Allowable-Codebase attribute; 11 bug fixes
Java SE 8 Update 11	2014-07-15	Java Dependency Analysis Tool (jdeps); Java Control Panel option to disable sponsors; JAR file attribute – Entry-Point; JAXP processing limit property – maxElementDepth; 18 security bug fixes, 15 bug fixes
Java SE 8 Update 20	2014-08-19	669 bug fixes, JMC 5.4, String deduplication (disabled by default)
Java SE 8 Update 25	2014-10-14	10 bug fixes
Java SE 8 Update 31	2015-01-19	26 bug fixes; SSLv3 (disabled by default)
Java SE 8 Update 40	2015-03-03	645 bug fixes, Added the notion of "memory pressure" to help indicate how much of system's memory is still available (low pressure = high memory, high pressure = low memory)
Java SE 8 Update 45	2015-04-14	13 bug fixes
Java SE 8 Update 51	2015-07-14	Added support for native sandbox on Windows platforms (disabled by default); also, 25 security fixes, 14 bug fixes
Java SE 8 Update 60	2015-08-18	480 bug fixes
Java SE 8 Update 65	2015-10-20	25 security fixes, 3 bug fixes
Java SE 8 Update 66	2015-11-16	15 bug fixes
Java SE 8 Update 71	2016-01-19	8 security fixes, 5 bug fixes
Java SE 8 Update 72	2016-01-19	8 security fixes, 5 bug fixes, several enhancements
Java SE 8 Update 73	2016-02-03	1 security fix
Java SE 8 Update 74	2016-02-03	1 security fix
Java SE 8 Update 77	2016-03-23	1 security fix
Java SE 8 Update 91	2016-04-19	9 security fixes, 4 bug fixes and enhancements
Java SE 8 Update 92	2016-04-19	Security and bug fixes from 8u91, plus 76 additional bug fixes; the ExitOnOutOfMemoryError and CrashOnOutOfMemoryError flags have been introduced
Java SE 8 Update 101	2016-07-19	Security and bug fixes from 8u92, plus 9 additional bug fixes
Java SE 8 Update 102	2016-07-19	Security and bug fixes from 8u101, plus 118 additional bug fixes
Java SE 8 Update 111	2016-10-18	7 Security fixes and 9 bug fixes
Java SE 8 Update 112	2016-10-18	Additional features and 139 bug fixes over 8u111
Java SE 8 Update 121	2017-01-17	3 additional features, 5 changes, and 11 bug fixes over 8u112.
Java SE 8 Update 131	2017-04-18	4 changes and 42 bug fixes (2 notable).
Java SE 8 Update 141	2017-07-18	Additional feature, 3 changes and 12 bug fixes.
Java SE 8 Update 144	2017-07-26	32 Security fixes and bug fixes from 8u141.
Java SE 8 Update 151	2017-10-17	22 Security fixes, 2 notes, 1 certificate revocation, 1 new feature, 6 changes and 24 bug fixes from 8u144.
Java SE 8 Update 152	2017-10-17	Security fixes, 1 new feature, 1 change and 238 bug fixes from 8u151 (1 notable).
Java SE 8 Update 161	2018-01-16	21 Security fixes, 3 new features, 9 changes and 1 bug fix from 8u152.
Java SE 8 Update 162	2018-01-16	Security fixes, 63 bug fixes.
Java SE 8 Update 171	2018-04-17	Security fixes, bug fixes.
Java SE 8 Update 172	2018-04-17	Security fixes, bug fixes.
Java SE 8 Update 181	2018-07-17	Security fixes, bug fixes.
Java SE 8 Update 191	2018-10-16	New features, changes, bug fixes, security fixes.
Java SE 8 Update 192	2018-10-16	New features, changes, bug fixes.
Java SE 8 Update 201	2019-01-15	New features, changes, bug fixes.
Java SE 8 Update 202	2019-01-15	New features, changes, bug fixes.
Java SE 8 Update 211	2019-04-16	New features, changes, bug fixes. License Update.
Java SE 8 Update 212	2019-04-16	New features (e.g. 5 currency symbols, including for Bitcoin and "New Japanese Era Name Reiwa"), changes, bug fixes. License Update.
Java SE 8 Update 221	2019-07-16	New features, changes, bug fixes.
Java SE 8 Update 231	2019-10-15	New features, changes, bug fixes and 18 security fixes.
Java SE 8 Update 241	2020-01-14	New features, changes, bug fixes.
Java SE 8 Update 251	2020-04-14	New features, changes, bug fixes. The last version that was shown to be working on Windows XP unofficially.
Java SE 8 Update 261	2020-07-14	New features, changes, 133 bug fixes.
Java SE 8 Update 271	2020-10-20	New features, changes, 65 bug fixes.
Java SE 8 Update 281	2021-01-19	New features, changes, 33 bug fixes.
Java SE 8 Update 291	2021-04-20	New features, changes, 28 bug fixes.
Java SE 8 Update 301	2021-07-20	New features, changes, 90 bug fixes.
Java SE 8 Update 311	2021-10-19	New features, changes, 52 bug fixes.
Java SE 8 Update 321	2022-01-18	New features, changes, 62 bug fixes.
Java SE 8 Update 331	2022-04-19	New features, changes, 37 bug fixes.
Java SE 8 Update 333	2022-05-02	Patch w/1 change and 2 bug fixes.
Java SE 8 Update 341	2022-07-19	New features, changes, 42 bug fixes.
Java SE 8 Update 351	2022-10-18	New features, changes, 95 bug fixes.
Java SE 8 Update 361	2023-01-17	New features, changes, bug fixes.
Java SE 8 Update 371	2023-04-18	
Java SE 8 Update 381	2023-07-18	Security Patches
Java SE 8 Update 391	2023-10-17	
Java SE 8 Update 401	2024-01-16	
Java SE 8 Update 411	2024-04-16	Update time zone data to IANA TZ Data 2024a, new features, changes, updates to third-party libraries, 37 bug fixes.
Java SE 8 Update 421	2024-07-16	
Java SE 8 Update 431	2024-10-15	
Java SE 8 Update 441	2025-01-21	
Java SE 8 Update 451	2025-04-15	
Java SE 8 Update 461	2025-07-15	
Java SE 8 Update 471	2025-10-21	
Java SE 8 Update 481	2026-01-20	
Java SE 8 Update 491	2026-04-21	
Java SE 8 Update 501	2026-07-21	
Java SE 8 Update 503	2026-08-18	
Java SE 8 Update 511	2026-10-20	

== Java SE 9 ==
Java SE 9
- Released: 21 September 2017 (9 years ago)
- # of JEPs: 9

Support ended
- Public: March 2018

Java SE 9 was made available on September 21, 2017 due to controversial acceptance of the current implementation of Project Jigsaw by Java Executive Committee which led Oracle to fix some open issues and concerns and to refine some critical technical questions. In the last days of June 2017, Java Community Process expressed nearly unanimous consensus on the proposed Module System scheme.

- JSR 376: Modularization of the JDK under Project Jigsaw (Java Platform Module System)
- JavaDB was removed from JDK
- JEP 193: Variable handles, define a standard means to invoke the equivalents of various java.util.concurrent.atomic and sun.misc.Unsafe operations
- JEP 213: Milling Project Coin, allow @SafeVarargs on private instance methods; Allow effectively-final variables to be used as resources in the try-with-resources statement; Allow diamond with anonymous classes if the argument type of the inferred type is denotable; Complete the removal, begun in Java SE 8, of underscore from the set of legal identifier names; Support for private methods in interfaces
- JEP 222: jshell: The Java Shell (Read-Eval-Print Loop): JShell is a REPL command-line interface for the Java language.
- JEP 254: Compact Strings
- JEP 263: HiDPI graphics: automatic scaling and sizing
- JEP 266: More concurrency updates, it includes a Java implementation of Reactive Streams, including a new Flow class that included the interfaces previously provided by Reactive Streams
- JEP 268: XML catalogs
- JEP 282: jlink: The Java Linker, create a tool that can assemble and optimize a set of modules and their dependencies into a custom run-time image. It effectively allows to produce a fully usable executable including the JVM to run it
- JEP 295: Ahead-of-Time Compilation, ahead-of-time compilation provided by GraalVM

The first Java 9 release candidate was released on August 9, 2017. The first stable release of Java 9 was on September 21, 2017.

=== History ===
At JavaOne 2011, Oracle discussed features they hoped to release for Java 9 in 2016. Java 9 should include better support for multi-gigabyte heaps, better native code integration, a different default garbage collector (G1, for "shorter response times") and a self-tuning JVM. In early 2016, the release of Java 9 was rescheduled for March 2017 and later again postponed four more months to July 2017.

=== Java 9 updates ===
Table of Java 9 updates
Release	Release date	Highlights
Java SE 9	2017-09-21	Initial release
Java SE 9.0.1	2017-10-17	New features: Add Additional IDL Stub Type Checks to org.omg.CORBA.ORB::string_to_object Method (other-libs/corba); Known issues: TLS does not work by default on OpenJDK 9 (security-libs/java.security); Changes: Remove revoked Swisscom root certificate "swisscomrootevca2" (security-libs/java.security); Refactor existing providers to refer to the same constants for default values for key length (security-libs/java.security); Collections use serialization filter to limit array sizes (security-libs/java.security); Add warnings to keytool when using JKS and JCEKS (security-libs/java.security); Other notes: Default timeouts have changed for FTP URL handler (core-libs/java.net); Bug fixes: 12 bug fixes
Java SE 9.0.4	2018-01-16	New features: Open source the root certificates in Oracle's Java SE Root CA program (security-libs/javax.net.ssl); Added TLS session hash and extended master secret extension support (security-libs/javax.net.ssl); Negotiated Finite Field Diffie-Hellman Ephemeral Parameters for TLS (security-libs/javax.net.ssl); Add additional IDL stub type checks to org.omg.CORBA.ORBstring_to_object method (other-libs/corba); Changes: RSA public key validation (security-libs/javax.crypto); Provider default key size is updated (security-libs/javax.crypto); Stricter key generation (security-libs/javax.crypto); Disable exportable cipher suites (security-libs/javax.net.ssl); JMX Connections need deserialization filters (core-svc/javax.management); JDK Transform, Validation and XPath use the system-default parser (xml/jaxp); Bug fixes: JNLP files won't launch from IE11 on Windows 10 Creators Update (deploy/webstart); 11 bug fixes

== Java SE 10 ==
Java SE 10
- Released: 20 March 2018 (8 years ago)
- # of JEPs: 12

Support ended
- Public: September 2018

OpenJDK 10 was released on March 20, 2018, with twelve new features confirmed. Among these features were:

- JEP 286: Local-Variable Type Inference
- JEP 296: Consolidate the JDK Forest into a Single Repository
- JEP 304: Garbage-Collector Interface
- JEP 307: Parallel Full GC for G1
- JEP 310: Application Class-Data Sharing
- JEP 312: Thread-Local Handshakes
- JEP 313: Remove the Native-Header Generation Tool (javah)
- JEP 314: Additional Unicode Language-Tag Extensions
- JEP 316: Heap Allocation on Alternative Memory Devices
- JEP 317: Experimental Java-Based JIT Compiler
- JEP 319: Root Certificates
- JEP 322: Time-Based Release Versioning

The first of these JEP 286 Local-Variable Type Inference, allows the var keyword to be used for local variables with the actual type calculated by the compiler. Due to this change, developers can do the following instead of manually specifying the variable's type:

var list = new ArrayList<String>(); // infers ArrayList<String>
var stream = list.stream();         // infers Stream<String>

=== Java 10 updates ===
Table of Java 10 updates
Release	Release date	Highlights
Java SE 10	2018-03-20	Initial release
Java SE 10.0.1	2018-04-17	New features: Enhanced KeyStore Mechanisms (security-libs/javax.crypto); Changes: XML Signatures Signed with EC Keys Less Than 224 Bits Disabled (security-libs/javax.xml.crypto); 3DES Cipher Suites Disabled (security-libs/javax.net.ssl); Other notes: CipherOutputStream Usage (security-libs/javax.crypto); Bug fixes: 5 bug fixes
Java SE 10.0.2	2018-07-17	Changes: filterArguments runs multiple filters in the wrong order (core-libs/java.lang.invoke); Improve LDAP support (core-libs/javax.naming); Better stack walking (core-libs/java.io:serialization); Bug fixes: JVM Crash during G1 GC (hotspot/gc); 7 bug fixes

== Java SE 11 (LTS) ==
Java SE 11
- LTS version
- Released: 25 September 2018 (8 years ago)
- # of JEPs: 17

Removal(s)
- Notable: Java applets, Java Web Start, JavaFX, JavaEE, and CORBA modules

JDK 11 was released on September 25, 2018 and the version is currently open for bug fixes. It offers LTS, or Long-Term Support. Among others, Java 11 includes a number of new features, such as:

- JEP 181: Nest-Based Access Control
- JEP 309: Dynamic Class-File Constants
- JEP 315: Improve Aarch64 Intrinsics
- JEP 318: Epsilon: A No-Op Garbage Collector
- JEP 320: Remove the Java EE and CORBA Modules
- JEP 321: HTTP Client (Standard)
- JEP 323: Local-Variable Syntax for Lambda Parameters
- JEP 324: Key Agreement with Curve25519 and Curve448
- JEP 327: Unicode 10
- JEP 328: Flight Recorder
- JEP 329: ChaCha20 and Poly1305 Cryptographic Algorithms
- JEP 330: Launch Single-File Source-Code Programs
- JEP 331: Low-Overhead Heap Profiling
- JEP 332: Transport Layer Security (TLS) 1.3
- JEP 333: ZGC: A Scalable Low-Latency Garbage Collector (Experimental)
- JEP 335: Deprecate the Nashorn JavaScript Engine
- JEP 336: Deprecate the Pack200 Tools and API

A number of features from previous releases were dropped; in particular, Java applets and Java Web Start are no longer available. JavaFX, Java EE and CORBA modules have been removed from JDK.

=== Java 11 updates ===
Table of Java 11 updates
Release	Release date	Highlights
Java SE 11	2018-09-25	Initial release
Java SE 11.0.1	2018-10-16	Changes: Added Additional TeliaSonera Root Certificate (security-libs/java.security); Improve LDAP support (core-libs/javax.naming); Changed Central File System Location for usagetracker.properties File (core-svc); Problem looking up Client Certificates in keystore (security-libs/javax.net.ssl); Disabled All DES TLS Cipher Suites (security-libs/javax.net.ssl); Improved Cipher Inputs (security-libs/javax.crypto); Bug fixes: LDAPS Communication Failure (core-libs/javax.naming); Better HTTP Redirection Support (core-libs/java.net); 5 bug fixes
Java SE 11.0.2	2019-01-15	Known issues: GTK+ 3.20 and Later Unsupported by Swing (client-libs); Changes: TLS anon and NULL Cipher Suites are Disabled (security-libs/javax.net.ssl); Linux Native Code Checks (hotspot/runtime); Enable Java Access Bridge Check Box Option in Control Panel Is Not Available with JDK 11 Installer (security-libs/javax.net.ssl); Bug fixes: 59 bug fixes
Java SE 11.0.3	2019-04-16	New features: Square Character Support for Japanese New Era (core-libs/java.util:i18n); Known issues: Java Access Bridge Installation Workaround (install); Changes: Added GlobalSign R6 Root Certificate (security-libs/java.security); Distrust TLS Server Certificates Anchored by Symantec Root CAs (security-libs/javax.net.ssl); New Japanese Era Name Reiwa (core-libs/java.time); Support New Japanese Era in java.time.chrono.JapaneseEra (core-libs/java.time); Bug fixes: 17 bug fixes
Java SE 11.0.4	2019-07-16	New features: HotSpot Windows OS Detection Correctly Identifies Windows Server 2019 (hotspot/runtime); Removed features and options: Removal of Two DocuSign Root CA Certificates (security-libs/java.security); Removal of Two Comodo Root CA Certificates (security-libs/java.security); Removal of T-Systems Deutsche Telekom Root CA 2 Certificate (security-libs/java.security); Removal of GTE CyberTrust Global Root (security-libs/java.security); Other notes: com.sun.org.apache.xml.internal.security.ignoreLineBreaks System Property (security-libs/javax.xml.crypto); System Property to Switch Between Implementations of ECC (security-libs/javax.crypto); Bug fixes: 42 bug fixes
Java SE 11.0.5	2019-10-15	New features: New Java Flight Recorder (JFR) Security Events (security-libs/java.security); Other notes: Using the JDK or JRE on macOS Catalina (10.15) (docs); Remove Obsolete NIST EC Curves from the Default TLS Algorithms (security-libs/javax.net.ssl); Use SunJCE Mac in SecretKeyFactory PBKDF2 Implementation (security-libs/javax.crypto); Java Access Bridge Installation Workaround (install); Updated XML Signature Implementation to Apache Santuario 2.1.3 (security-libs/javax.xml.crypto); System Property jdk.security.useLegacyECC is Turned Off by Default (security-libs/javax.crypto); Changed Properties.loadFromXML to Comply with Specification (core-libs/java.util); Runtime.exec and ProcessBuilder Argument Restrictions (core-libs/java.lang); Windows 2019 Core Server Is Not Supported (client-libs/2d); Bug fixes: 83 bug fixes
Java SE 11.0.6	2020-01-14	New features: Allow SASL Mechanisms to Be Restricted (security-libs/javax.security); SunPKCS11 Provider Upgraded with Support for PKCS#11 v2.40 (security-libs/javax.crypto:pkcs11); Other notes: Improve Registry Support (core-libs/java.rmi); New Checks on Trust Anchor Certificates (security-libs/java.security); Exact Match Required for Trusted TLS Server Certificate (security-libs/java.security); Added LuxTrust Global Root 2 Certificate (install/security-libs/java.security); Added 4 Amazon Root CA Certificates (security-libs/java.security); Turn off AOT by Default and Change Related Flags to Experimental (hotspot/compiler); Epsilon GC handled checked array stores incorrectly (hotspot/gc); Bug fixes: Memory Growth Issue in SunPKCS11 Fixed (security-libs/javax.crypto:pkcs11); Better Serial Filter Handling (core-libs/java.io:serialization); 123 bug fixes
Java SE 11.0.7	2020-04-14	New features: Support for MS Cryptography Next Generation (CNG) (security-libs/javax.crypto); Bug fixes: 140 bug fixes
Java SE 11.0.8	2020-07-14	New features: New System Properties to Configure the TLS Signature Schemes (security-libs/javax.net.ssl); Apache Santuario Library Updated to Version 2.1.4 (security-libs/javax.xml.crypto); Toolchain Upgrade to Xcode 10.1 (infrastructure); Oracle JDK Installer for Windows Provides Executables (javac, etc) in a Path Reachable From Any Command Prompt (install/install); Removed features and options: Removal of Comodo Root CA Certificate (security-libs/java.security); Removal of DocuSign Root CA Certificate (security-libs/java.security); Other notes: Improved Serialization Handling (security-libs/javax.net.ssl); Better Listing of Arrays (security-libs/javax.net.ssl); Default SSLEngine Should Create in Server Role (security-libs/javax.net.sslc); OperatingSystemMXBean Methods Inside a Container Return Container Specific Data (core-svc/java.lang.management); Default SSL Session Cache Size Updated to 20480 (security-libs); Deprecated NSWindowStyleMaskTexturedBackground (client-libs/javax.swing); Bug fixes: 167 bug fixes
Java SE 11.0.9	2020-10-20	New features: Weak Named Curves in TLS, CertPath, and Signed JAR Disabled by Default (security-libs/java.security); Support for Kerberos Cross-Realm Referrals (RFC 6806) (security-libs/org.ietf.jgss:krb5); Improve Certificate Chain Handling (security-libs/javax.net.ssl); Tools Warn If Weak Algorithms Are Used (security-libs/java.security); Support for canonicalize in krb5.conf (security-libs/org.ietf.jgss:krb5); Other notes: Added Property to Control LDAP Authentication Mechanisms Allowed to Authenticate Over Clear Connections (core-libs/javax.naming); Added 3 SSL Corporation Root CA Certificates (security-libs/java.security); Added Entrust Root Certification Authority – G4 certificate (security-libs/java.security); Localized Time Zone Name Inconsistency Between English and Other Locales (core-libs/java.util:i18n); Enhanced Support of Proxy Class (core-libs/java.io:serialization); Bug fixes: 118 bug fixes
Java SE 11.0.10	2021-01-19	New features: -groupname Option Added to keytool Key Pair Generation (security-libs/java.security); Support for certificate_authorities Extension (security-libs/javax.net.ssl); POSIX_SPAWN Option on Linux (core-libs/java.lang); Support for X25519 and X448 in TLS (security-libs/javax.net.ssl); jarsigner Preserves POSIX File Permission and symlink Attributes (security-libs/java.security); Other notes: Oracle JDK11u for Solaris Now Requires harfbuzz to be Installed (client-libs/2d); JDK time-zone data upgraded to tzdata2020d (core-libs/java.time); JDK time-zone data upgraded to tzdata2020c (core-libs/java.time); US/Pacific-New Zone Name Removed as Part of tzdata2020b (core-libs/java.time); Bug fixes: 118 bug fixes
Java SE 11.0.11	2021-04-20	New features: jdeps --print-module-deps Reports Transitive Dependences (tools); Other notes: New System and Security Properties to Control Reconstruction of Remote Objects by JDK's Built-in JNDI RMI and LDAP Implementations (core-libs/javax.naming); Added 2 HARICA Root CA Certificates (security-libs/java.security); Disable TLS 1.0 and 1.1 (security-libs/javax.net.ssl); Modified the MS950 charset Encoder's Conversion Table (core-libs/java.nio.charsets); Less Ambiguous Processing of ProcessBuilder Quotes on Windows > (core-libs/java.lang); Bug fixes: 88 bug fixes
Java SE 11.0.12	2021-07-20	New features: Support cross-realm MSSFU (security-libs/org.ietf.jgss:krb5); Customizing PKCS12 keystore Generation (security-libs/java.security); Removed features and options: Removed Root Certificates with 1024-bit Keys (security-libs/java.security); Removed Telia Company's Sonera Class2 CA Certificate (security-libs/java.security); Other notes: Updated List of Capabilities Provided by JDK RPMs (install/install); ADDLOCAL=ToolsFeature,SourceFeature Argument No Longer Needed For Windows JDK Installer (install/install); Upgraded the Default PKCS12 Encryption and MAC Algorithms (security-libs/java.security); Disable SHA-1 JARs (security-libs/java.security); Improve Encoding of TLS Application-Layer Protocol Negotiation (ALPN) Values (security-libs/javax.net.ssl); URL FTP Protocol Handler: IPv4 Address Validation in Passive Mode (core-libs/java.net); Bug fixes: 106 bug fixes
Java SE 11.0.13	2021-10-19	New features: Context-specific Deserialization Filters (core-libs/java.io:serialization); Removed features and options: Removed IdenTrust Root Certificate (security-libs/java.security); Remove the Experimental AOT and JIT Compiler in OracleJDK 11u (hotspot/compiler); Other notes: Release Doesn't Correctly Recognize Windows 11 (core-libs/java.lang); Change to Package Names in Linux RPM/DEB Installers (install); Updated the Default Enabled Cipher Suites Preference (security-libs/javax.net.ssl); System Property to Control Reconstruction of Reference Address Objects by JDK's Built-in JNDI LDAP Implementation (core-libs/javax.naming); Release Doesn't Correctly Recognize Windows Server 2022 (hotspot/runtime); Updated keytool to Create AKID From SKID of Issuing Certificate as Specified by RFC 5280 (security-libs/java.security); SunPKCS11 Initialization With NSS When External FIPS Modules Are in Security Modules Database (security-libs/javax.crypto:pkcs11); Bug fixes: 93 bug fixes
Java SE 11.0.14	2022-01-18	New features: New SunPKCS11 Configuration Properties (security-libs/javax.crypto:pkcs11); Configurable Extensions With System Properties (security-libs/javax.net.ssl); Removed features and options: Removed Google's GlobalSign Root Certificate (security-libs/java.security); Other notes: Zip File System Provider Throws ZipException When Entry Name Element Contains "." or ".." (core-libs/java.nio); Update Timezone Data to 2021c (core-libs/java.time); LDAP Channel Binding Support for Java GSS/Kerberos (core-libs/javax.naming); SocketExceptions Are Not Wrapped Into SSLExceptions in SSLSocketImpl (security-libs/javax.net.ssl); OperatingSystemMXBean.getProcessCpuLoad Is Now Container Aware (hotspot/runtime); Bug fixes: 71 bug fixes
Java SE 11.0.15	2022-04-19	New features: SunPKCS11 Provider Supports ChaCha20-Poly1305 Cipher and ChaCha20 KeyGenerator if Supported by PKCS11 Library (security-libs/javax.crypto:pkcs11); ChaCha20 and Poly1305 TLS Cipher Suites (security-libs/javax.net.ssl); New XML Processing Limits (xml/jaxp); Other notes: Only Expose Certificates With Proper Trust Settings as Trusted Certificate Entries in macOS KeychainStore (security-libs/java.security); Parsing of URL Strings in Built-in JNDI Providers Is More Strict (core-libs/javax.naming); Bug fixes: 81 bug fixes
Java SE 11.0.16	2022-07-19	New features: HTTPS Channel Binding Support for Java GSS/Kerberos (core-libs/java.net); Other notes: Update java.net.InetAddress to Detect Ambiguous IPv4 Address Literals (core-libs/java.net); JDK Bundle Extensions Truncated When Downloading Using Firefox 102 (core-libs/java.io:serialization); Vector Should Throw ClassNotFoundException for a Missing Class of an Element (core-libs/java.io:serialization); Default JDK Compressor Will Be Closed when IOException Is Encountered (core-libs/java.util.jar); Bug fixes: 74 bug fixes
Java SE 11.0.16.1	2022-08-18	Changes: C2 Compilation Errors Unpredictably Crashes JVM (hotspot/compiler)
Java SE 11.0.17	2022-10-18	New features: Upgrade the Default PKCS12 MAC Algorithm (security-libs/java.security); JDK Flight Recorder Event for Deserialization (core-libs/java.io:serialization); Other notes: Disabled SHA-1 Signed JARs (security-libs/java.security); Deprecate 3DES and RC4 in Kerberos (security-libs/org.ietf.jgss:krb5); Make HttpURLConnection Default Keep Alive Timeout Configurable (core-libs/java.net); CPU Shares Ignored When Computing Active Processor Count (hotspot/runtime); Update Timezone Data to 2022c (core-libs/java.time); New System Property to Limit the Number of Open Connections to com.sun.net.httpserver.HttpServer (core-libs/java.net); Bug fixes: 118 bug fixes
Java SE 11.0.18	2023-01-17	New features: DTLS Resumption Uses HelloVerifyRequest Messages (security-libs/javax.net.ssl); Support for RSASSA-PSS in OCSP Response (security-libs/java.security); Known issues: Installation of Oracle Linux Specific x64 JDK RPMs Pulls in i686 Dependencies (install/install); Other notes: FXML JavaScript Engine Disabled by Default (javafx/fxml); Translated resource bundles for German (globalization); RPM JDK Installer Changes (install/install); Disable Side-by-Side Installations of Multiple JDK Updates in Windows JDK Installers (install/install); All JDK Update Releases Are Installed Into the Same Directory on macOS (install/install); Incorrect Handling of Quoted Arguments in ProcessBuilder (core-libs/java.lang); New Implementation Note for LoginModule on Removing Null from a Principals or Credentials set (security-libs/javax.security); Toolchain Upgrade to Visual Studio 2022 (infrastructure); Change in SSLEngine.closeInbound() Behavior (security-libs/javax.net.ssl); Bug fixes: 58 bug fixes
Java SE 11.0.19	2023-04-18	New features: Added a Default Native GSS-API Library on Windows (security-libs/org.ietf.jgss); Other notes: System Property to Handle HTML ObjectView Creation (client-libs/javax.swing); Added Certigna(Dhimyotis) Root CA Certificate (security-libs/java.security); Removed SSLv2Hello and SSLv3 From Default Enabled TLS Protocols (security-libs/javax.net.ssl); File::listRoots Changed to Return All Available Drives on Windows (core-libs/java.io); Crypto-J Exception for Diffie-Hellman and DSA AlgorithmParameters Requests (security-libs/java.security); Bug fixes: 55 bug fixes
Java SE 11.0.20	2023-07-18	New features: Allow Additional Characters for GB18030-2022 Support (core-libs/java.lang); Support for GB18030-2022 (core-libs/java.nio.charsets); Update the Javadoc in the Character Class to State Support for GB 18030-2022 Implementation Level 2 (core-libs/java.lang); Windows KeyStore Updated to Include Access to the Local Machine Location (security-libs/java.security); New JFR Event: jdk.InitialSecurityProperty (security-libs/java.security); New JFR Event: jdk.SecurityProviderService (security-libs/java.security); JDK Now Accepts RSA Keys in PKCS#1 Format (security-libs/javax.crypto); Known issues: Problem Upgrading JDK on Windows if System User Is Using Shared Files (install); Other notes: System Property to Turn off JDK-8251329 Restrictions (core-libs/java.nio); Missing /usr/java/default Symlink on Linux Restored (install/install); Installation of JDK RPM Corrupts Alternatives (install/install); Added TWCA Root CA Certificate (security-libs/java.security); Added 4 GTS Root CA Certificates (security-libs/java.security); Added Microsoft Corporation's 2 TLS Root CA Certificates (security-libs/java.security); System Property for Java SE Specification Maintenance Version (core-libs/java.lang); GregorianCalender.computeTime() JVM Crash (hotspot/compiler); ASLR Support for CDS Archive (hotspot/runtime); Throw Error If Default java.security File Fails to Load (security-libs/java.security); New System Property to Control the Maximum Size of Signature Files (security-libs/java.security); Improved ZIP64 Extra Field Validation (core-libs/java.util.jar); Bug fixes: 43 bug fixes
Java SE 11.0.21	2023-10-17	New features: -XshowSettings:locale Output Now Includes Tzdata Version (tools/launcher); Removed features and options: Removed SECOM Trust System's RootCA1 Root Certificate (security-libs/java.security); Other notes: Added Certigna Root CA Certificate (security-libs/java.security); Debian JDK Installer Changes (install/install); Ignore Allow and Disallow Options for java.security.manager System Property (security-libs/java.security); The Default TLS Diffie-Hellman Group Size Has Been Increased from 1024-bit to 2048-bit (security-libs/javax.net.ssl); Use Server Cipher Suites Preference by Default (security-libs/javax.net.ssl); Bug fixes: 29 bug fixes
Java SE 11.0.22	2024-01-16	New features: New System Property to Toggle XML Signature Secure Validation Mode (security-libs/javax.xml.crypto); Known issues: Potential Performance Regression Due to Limited Range Check Elimination (hotspot/compiler); Other notes: Add Process-Memory Information to hs-err and VM.info (hotspot/runtime); Increase Default Value of the System Property jdk.jar.maxSignatureFileSize (security-libs/java.security); Added Four Root Certificates from DigiCert, Inc. (security-libs/java.security); Added Three Root Certificates from eMudhra Technologies Limited (security-libs/java.security); Added Telia Root CA v2 Certificate (security-libs/java.security); Added ISRG Root X2 CA Certificate from Let's Encrypt (security-libs/java.security); Call X509KeyManager.chooseClientAlias Once for All Key Types (security-libs/javax.net.ssl); Add Process-Memory Information to hs-err and VM.info (hotspot/runtime); Bug fixes: 29 bug fixes
Java SE 11.0.23	2024-04-16	
Java SE 11.0.24	2024-07-16	
Java SE 11.0.25	2024-10-15	
Java SE 11.0.26	2025-01-21	
Java SE 11.0.27	2025-04-15	
Java SE 11.0.28	2025-07-15	
Java SE 11.0.29	2025-10-21	

== Java SE 12 ==
Java SE 12
- Released: 19 March 2019 (7 years ago)
- # of JEPs: 8

Addition(s)
- Preview(s): Enhanced switch statements

Support ended
- Public: September 2019

JDK 12 was released on March 19, 2019. Among others, Java 12 includes a number of new features, such as:

- JEP 189: Shenandoah: A Low-Pause-Time Garbage Collector (Experimental)
- JEP 230: Microbenchmark Suite
- JEP 325: Switch Expressions (Preview)
- JEP 334: JVM Constants API
- JEP 340: One AArch64 Port, Not Two
- JEP 341: Default CDS Archives
- JEP 344: Abortable Mixed Collections for G1
- JEP 346: Promptly Return Unused Committed Memory from G1

The preview feature JEP 325 extends the switch statement so it can also be used as an expression, and adds a new form of case label where the right hand side is an expression. No break statement is needed. For complex expressions a yield statement can be used. This becomes standard in Java SE 14.

int ndays = switch(month) {
    case JAN, MAR, MAY, JUL, AUG, OCT, DEC -> 31;
    case APR, JUN, SEP, NOV -> 30;
    case FEB -> {
        if (year % 400 == 0) yield 29;
        else if (year % 100 == 0) yield 28;
        else if (year % 4 == 0) yield 29;
        else yield 28; }
};

=== Java 12 updates ===
Table of Java 12 updates
Release	Release date	Highlights
Java SE 12	2019-03-19	Initial release
Java SE 12.0.1	2019-04-16	Known issues: Java Access Bridge Installation Workaround (install); Changes: Added GlobalSign R6 Root Certificate (security-libs/java.security); New Japanese Era Name Reiwa (core-libs/java.time); Bug fixes: 3 bug fixes
Java SE 12.0.2	2019-07-16	Removed features and options: Removal of Two DocuSign Root CA Certificates (security-libs/java.security); Removal of Two Comodo Root CA Certificates (security-libs/java.security); Removal of T-Systems Deutsche Telekom Root CA 2 Certificate (security-libs/java.security); Other notes: Java Access Bridge Installation Workaround (install)

== Java SE 13 ==
Java SE 13
- Released: 17 September 2019 (7 years ago)
- # of JEPs: 5

Addition(s)
- Preview(s): Enhanced switch statements, text blocks

Support ended
- Public: March 2023

JDK 13 was released on September 17, 2019. Java 13 includes the following new features, as well as "hundreds of smaller enhancements and thousands of bug fixes".

- JEP 350: Dynamic CDS Archives
- JEP 351: ZGC: Uncommit Unused Memory
- JEP 353: Reimplement the Legacy Socket API
- JEP 354: Switch Expressions (Preview)
- JEP 355: Text Blocks (Preview)

JEP 355 Text Blocks allows multiline string literals:

String html = """
              <html lang="en">
                  <body>
                      <p>Hello, world</p>
                  </body>
              </html>
              """;

=== Java 13 updates ===
Table of Java 13 updates
Release	Release date	Highlights
Java SE 13	2019-09-17	Initial release
Java SE 13.0.1	2019-10-15	Other notes: Using the JDK or JRE on macOS Catalina (10.15) (docs); Remove Obsolete NIST EC Curves from the Default TLS Algorithms (security-libs/javax.net.ssl); Text Visibility Issues in macOS Dark Mode (client-libs); Runtime.exec and ProcessBuilder Argument Restrictions (core-libs/java.lang)
Java SE 13.0.2	2020-01-14	Other notes: New Checks on Trust Anchor Certificates (security-libs/java.security); Exact Match Required for Trusted TLS Server Certificate (security-libs/java.security); Added LuxTrust Global Root 2 Certificate (security-libs/java.security); Added 4 Amazon Root CA Certificates (security-libs/java.security); Improve Registry Support (core-libs/java.rmi); Bug fixes: Better Serial Filter Handling (core-libs/java.io:serialization); 29 bug fixes

== Java SE 14 ==
Java SE 14
- Released: 17 March 2020 (6 years ago)
- # of JEPs: 16

Addition(s)
- Notable: Helpful NullPointerExceptions, enhanced switch statements
- Preview(s): Pattern matching for instanceof, records, text blocks
- Incubating: jpackager, Foreign memory access

Removal(s)
- Notable: Remove Concurrent Mark Sweep garbage collector

Support ended
- Public: September 2020

JDK 14 was released on March 17, 2020. Java 14 includes the following new features, as well as "hundreds of smaller enhancements and thousands of bug fixes".

- JEP 305: Pattern Matching for instanceof (Preview)
- JEP 343: Packaging Tool (Incubator)
- JEP 345: NUMA-Aware Memory Allocation for G1
- JEP 349: JFR Event Streaming
- JEP 352: Non-Volatile Mapped Byte Buffers
- JEP 358: Helpful NullPointerExceptions
- JEP 359: Records (Preview)
- JEP 361: Switch Expressions (Standard)
- JEP 362: Deprecate the Solaris and SPARC Ports
- JEP 363: Remove the Concurrent Mark Sweep (CMS) Garbage Collector
- JEP 364: ZGC on macOS
- JEP 365: ZGC on Windows
- JEP 366: Deprecate the ParallelScavenge + SerialOld GC Combination
- JEP 367: Remove the Pack200 Tools and API
- JEP 368: Text Blocks (Second Preview)
- JEP 370: Foreign-Memory Access API (Incubator)

JEP 305, Pattern Matching for instanceof simplifies the common case of an instanceof test being immediately followed by cast, replacing

if (obj instanceof String) {
    String s = (String)obj;
    System.out.println(s.length());
}

with

if (obj instanceof String s) {
    System.out.println(s.length());
}

JEP 359 Records allows easy creation of simple immutable Tuple-like classes.

record Point(int x, int y) { }
Point p = new Point(3, 4);
System.out.println(p.x());

=== Java 14 updates ===
Table of Java 14 updates
Release	Release date	Highlights
Java SE 14	2020-03-17	Initial release
Java SE 14.0.1	2020-04-14	Bug fixes: 2 bug fixes
Java SE 14.0.2	2020-07-14	Removed features and options: Removal of Comodo Root CA Certificate (security-libs/java.security); Removal of DocuSign Root CA Certificate (security-libs/java.security); Other notes: Better Listing of Arrays (core-libs/java.util:collections); Default SSLEngine Should Create in Server Role (security-libs/javax.net.ssl); Improved Serialization Handling (core-libs/java.io:serialization); Bug fixes: 8 bug fixes

== Java SE 15 ==
Java SE 15
- Released: 15 September 2020 (6 years ago)
- # of JEPs: 14

Addition(s)
- Notable: Hidden classes, ZGC (garbage collector), Shenandoah (garbage collector), text blocks
- Preview(s): Sealed classes, pattern matching of instanceof, records
- Incubating: Foreign-memory access

Removal(s)
- Notable: JavaScript engine, Solaris and SPARC ports

Support ended
- Public: March 2023

JDK 15 was released on September 15, 2020. Java 15 adds e.g. support for multi-line string literals (aka Text Blocks). The Shenandoah and Z garbage collectors (latter sometimes abbreviated ZGC) are now ready for use in production (i.e. no longer marked experimental). Support for Oracle's Solaris operating system (and SPARC CPUs) is dropped (while still available in e.g. Java 11). The Nashorn JavaScript Engine is removed. Also removed some root CA certificates.

- JEP 339: Edwards-Curve Digital Signature Algorithm (EdDSA)
- JEP 360: Sealed Classes (Preview)
- JEP 371: Hidden Classes
- JEP 372: Remove the Nashorn JavaScript Engine
- JEP 373: Reimplement the Legacy DatagramSocket API
- JEP 374: Disable and Deprecate Biased Locking
- JEP 375: Pattern Matching for instanceof (Second Preview)
- JEP 377: ZGC: A Scalable Low-Latency Garbage Collector
- JEP 378: Text Blocks
- JEP 379: Shenandoah: A Low-Pause-Time Garbage Collector
- JEP 381: Remove the Solaris and SPARC Ports
- JEP 383: Foreign-Memory Access API (Second Incubator)
- JEP 384: Records (Second Preview)
- JEP 385: Deprecate RMI Activation for Removal

JEP 360 Sealed Classes adds sealed classes and interfaces that restrict which other classes or interfaces may extend or implement them. Only those classes specified in a permits clause may extend the class or interface.

package com.example.geometry;

public abstract sealed class Shape
    permits Circle, Rectangle, Square {...}

Together with records, sealed classes are sum types. They work well with other recent features like records, switch expressions, and pattern matching for instance-of. They all form part of a system for "Pattern matching in Java" first discussed by Gavin Bierman and Brian Goetz, in September 2018.

=== Java 15 updates ===
Table of Java 15 updates
Release	Release date	Highlights
Java SE 15	2020-09-15	Initial release
Java SE 15.0.1	2020-10-20	New features: Improve Certificate Chain Handling (security-libs/javax.net.ssl); Other notes: Added Property to Control LDAP Authentication Mechanisms Allowed to Authenticate Over Clear Connections (core-libs/javax.naming); Added 3 SSL Corporation Root CA Certificates (security-libs/java.security); Added Entrust Root Certification Authority – G4 certificate (security-libs/java.security); Enhanced Support of Proxy Class (core-libs/java.io:serialization); Bug fixes: 8 bug fixes
Java SE 15.0.2	2021-01-19	Other notes: JDK time-zone data upgraded to tzdata2020d (core-libs/java.time); JDK time-zone data upgraded to tzdata2020c (core-libs/java.time); US/Pacific-New Zone Name Removed as Part of tzdata2020b (core-libs/java.time); Bug fixes: 24 bug fixes

== Java SE 16 ==
Java SE 16
- Released: 16 March 2021 (5 years ago)
- # of JEPs: 17

Addition(s)
- Notable: Windows/AArch64 Port, jpackager, pattern matching for instanceof, records
- Preview(s): Sealed classes
- Incubating: Foreign linker, Foreign-memory access

Support ended
- Public: September 2021

JDK 16 was released on March 16, 2021. Java 16 removes Ahead-of-Time compilation (and Graal JIT) options. The Java implementation itself was and is still written in C++, while as of Java 16, more recent C++14 (but still not e.g. C++17 or C++20) is allowed. The code was also moved to GitHub, dropping Mercurial as the source control system.

- JEP 338: Vector API (Incubator)
- JEP 347: Enable C++14 Language Features
- JEP 357: Migrate from Mercurial to Git
- JEP 369: Migrate to GitHub
- JEP 376: ZGC: Concurrent Thread-Stack Processing
- JEP 380: Unix-Domain Socket Channels
- JEP 386: Alpine Linux Port — not yet stable
- JEP 387: Elastic Metaspace
- JEP 388: Windows/AArch64 Port
- JEP 389: Foreign Linker API (Incubator)
- JEP 390: Warnings for Value-Based Classes
- JEP 392: Packaging Tool
- JEP 393: Foreign-Memory Access API (Third Incubator)
- JEP 394: Pattern Matching for instanceof
- JEP 395: Records
- JEP 396: Strongly Encapsulate JDK Internals by Default
- JEP 397: Sealed Classes (Second Preview)

=== Java 16 updates ===
Table of Java 16 updates
Release	Release date	Highlights
Java SE 16	2021-03-16	Initial release
Java SE 16.0.1	2021-04-20	Other notes: New System and Security Properties to Control Reconstruction of Remote Objects by JDK's Built-in JNDI RMI and LDAP Implementations (core-libs/javax.naming); Added 2 HARICA Root CA Certificates (security-libs/java.security); Less Ambiguous Processing of ProcessBuilder Quotes on Windows (core-libs/java.lang); Bug fixes: 30 bug fixes
Java SE 16.0.2	2021-07-20	Removed features and options: Removed Telia Company's Sonera Class2 CA certificate (security-libs/java.security); Other notes: Updated List of Capabilities Provided by JDK RPMs (install/install); Change to Package Names in Linux RPM/DEB Installers (install/install); URL FTP Protocol Handler: IPv4 Address Validation in Passive Mode (core-libs/java.net); SocketExceptions Are Not Wrapped Into SSLExceptions in SSLSocketImpl (security-libs/javax.net.ssl); Disable SHA-1 JARs (security-libs/java.security); Bug fixes: 25 bug fixes

== Java SE 17 (LTS) ==
Java SE 17
- LTS version
- Released: 14 September 2021 (5 years ago)
- # of JEPs: 14

Addition(s)
- Notable: macOS/AArch64 Port, sealed classes
- Preview(s): Switch pattern matching
- Incubating: Vector API, Foreign function & memory API

Removal(s)
- Notable: AOT compiler, RMI activation, strictfp keyword made obsolete (JEP 306)

JDK 17 was released in September 2021. Java 17 is the 2nd long-term support (LTS) release since switching to the new 6-month release cadence (the first being Java 11).

- JEP 306: Restore Always-Strict Floating-Point Semantics
- JEP 356: Enhanced Pseudo-Random Number Generators
- JEP 382: New macOS Rendering Pipeline
- JEP 391: macOS/AArch64 Port
- JEP 398: Deprecate the Applet API for Removal
- JEP 403: Strongly Encapsulate JDK Internals
- JEP 406: Pattern Matching for switch (Preview)
- JEP 407: Remove RMI Activation
- JEP 409: Sealed Classes
- JEP 410: Remove the Experimental AOT and JIT Compiler
- JEP 411: Deprecate the Security Manager for Removal
- JEP 412: Foreign Function & Memory API (Incubator)
- JEP 414: Vector API (Second Incubator)
- JEP 415: Context-Specific Deserialization Filters

JEP 406 extends the pattern matching syntax used in instanceof operations to switch statements and expressions. It allows cases to be selected based on the type of the argument, null cases and refining patterns

Object o = ...;
return switch (o) {
        case null       -> "Null";
        case String s   -> "String %s".formatted(s);
        case Long l     -> "long %d".formatted(l);
        case Double d   -> "double %f".formatted(d);
        case Integer i && i > 0                            // refining patterns
                        -> "positive int %d".formatted(i);
        case Integer i && i == 0
                        -> "zero int %d".formatted(i);
        case Integer i && i < 0
                        -> "negative int %d".formatted(i);
        default         -> o.toString();
};

=== Java 17 updates ===
Table of Java 17 updates
Release	Release date	Highlights
Java SE 17	2021-09-14	Initial release
Java SE 17.0.1	2021-10-19	Removed features and options: Removed IdenTrust Root Certificate (security-libs/java.security); Other notes: Release Doesn't Correctly Recognize Windows 11 (core-libs/java.lang); System Property to Control Reconstruction of Reference Address Objects by JDK's Built-in JNDI LDAP Implementation (core-libs/javax.naming); Release Doesn't Correctly Recognize Windows Server 2022 (hotspot/runtime); OperatingSystemMXBean.getProcessCpuLoad Is Now Container Aware (hotspot/runtime); Bug fixes: 21 bug fixes
Java SE 17.0.2	2022-01-18	Removed features and options: Removed Google's GlobalSign Root Certificate (security-libs/java.security); Other notes: Extended Delay Before JDK Executable Installer Starts From Network Drive (install/install); file.encoding System Property Has an Incorrect Value on Windows (core-libs/java.io); Zip File System Provider Throws ZipException When Entry Name Element Contains "." or ".." (core-libs/java.nio); Update Timezone Data to 2021c (core-libs/java.time); ZGC: Fixed long Process Non-Strong References times (hotspot/gc); Bug fixes: 164 bug fixes
Java SE 17.0.3	2022-04-19	New features: New XML Processing Limits (xml/jaxp); Other notes: Only Expose Certificates With Proper Trust Settings as Trusted Certificate Entries in macOS KeychainStore (security-libs/java.security); Parsing of URL Strings in Built-in JNDI Providers Is More Strict (core-libs/javax.naming); Bug fixes: 48 bug fixes
Java SE 17.0.3.1	2022-05-02	Changes: New System Property to Disable Windows Alternate Data Stream Support in java.io.File (core-libs/java.io); Bug fixes: 2 bug fixes
Java SE 17.0.4	2022-07-19	New features: HTTPS Channel Binding Support for Java GSS/Kerberos (core-libs/java.net); Other notes: Update java.net.InetAddress to Detect Ambiguous IPv4 Address Literals (core-libs/java.net); Default JDK Compressor Will Be Closed when IOException Is Encountered (core-libs/java.util.jar); CPU Shares Ignored When Computing Active Processor Count (hotspot/runtime); Bug fixes: 60 bug fixes
Java SE 17.0.4.1	2022-08-18	Changes: C2 Compilation Errors Unpredictably Crashes JVM (hotspot/compiler)
Java SE 17.0.5	2022-10-18	New features: HTTPS Channel Binding Support for Java GSS/Kerberos (core-libs/java.net); Other notes: Update java.net.InetAddress to Detect Ambiguous IPv4 Address Literals (core-libs/java.net); Default JDK Compressor Will Be Closed when IOException Is Encountered (core-libs/java.util.jar); CPU Shares Ignored When Computing Active Processor Count (hotspot/runtime); Bug fixes: 77 bug fixes
Java SE 17.0.6	2023-01-17	New features: DTLS Resumption Uses HelloVerifyRequest Messages (security-libs/javax.net.ssl); Support for RSASSA-PSS in OCSP Response (security-libs/java.security); Known issues: Installation of Oracle Linux Specific x64 JDK RPMs Pulls in i686 Dependencies (install/install); Other notes: FXML JavaScript Engine Disabled by Default (javafx/fxml); Translated resource bundles for German (globalization); RPM JDK Installer Changes (install/install); Disable Side-by-Side Installations of Multiple JDK Updates in Windows JDK Installers (install/install); All JDK Update Releases Are Installed Into the Same Directory on macOS (install/install); Incorrect Handling of Quoted Arguments in ProcessBuilder (core-libs/java.lang); New Implementation Note for LoginModule on Removing Null from a Principals or Credentials set (security-libs/javax.security); Toolchain Upgrade to Visual Studio 2022 (infrastructure); Change in SSLEngine.closeInbound() Behavior (security-libs/javax.net.ssl); Bug fixes: 52 bug fixes
Java SE 17.0.7	2023-04-18	New features: New JFR Event: jdk.InitialSecurityProperty (security-libs/java.security); Other notes: System Property to Handle HTML ObjectView Creation (client-libs/javax.swing); Added Certigna(Dhimyotis) CA Certificate (security-libs/java.security); File::listRoots Changed to Return All Available Drives on Windows (core-libs/java.io); Throw Error If Default java.security File Fails to Load (security-libs/java.security); Crypto-J Exception for Diffie-Hellman and DSA AlgorithmParameters Requests (security-libs/java.security); Bug fixes: 69 bug fixes
Java SE 17.0.8	2023-07-18	New features: Support for GB18030-2022 (core-libs/java.nio.charsets); Windows KeyStore Updated to Include Access to the Local Machine Location (security-libs/java.security); New JFR Event: jdk.SecurityProviderService (security-libs/java.security); Known issues: Problem Upgrading JDK on Windows if System User Is Using Shared Files (install); Other notes: System Property to Turn off JDK-8251329 Restrictions (core-libs/java.nio); Debian JDK Installer Changes (install/install); Missing /usr/java/default Symlink on Linux Restored (install/install); Installation of JDK RPM Corrupts Alternatives (install/install); Added TWCA Root CA Certificate (security-libs/java.security); Added 4 GTS Root CA Certificates (security-libs/java.security); Added Microsoft Corporation's 2 TLS Root CA Certificates (security-libs/java.security); GregorianCalender.computeTime() JVM Crash (hotspot/compiler); ASLR Support for CDS Archive (hotspot/runtime); New System Property to Control the Maximum Size of Signature Files (security-libs/java.security); Improved ZIP64 Extra Field Validation (core-libs/java.util.jar); Bug fixes: 56 bug fixes
Java SE 17.0.9	2023-10-17	New features: -XshowSettings:locale Output Now Includes Tzdata Version (tools/launcher); Removed features and options: Removed SECOM Trust System's RootCA1 Root Certificate (security-libs/java.security); Other notes: Added Certigna Root CA Certificate (security-libs/java.security); The Default TLS Diffie-Hellman Group Size Has Been Increased from 1024-bit to 2048-bit (security-libs/javax.net.ssl); Bug fixes: 56 bug fixes
Java SE 17.0.10	2024-01-16	New features: New System Property to Toggle XML Signature Secure Validation Mode (security-libs/javax.xml.crypto); Known issues: Potential Performance Regression Due to Limited Range Check Elimination (hotspot/compiler); Other notes: Increase Default Value of the System Property jdk.jar.maxSignatureFileSize (security-libs/java.security); Added Four Root Certificates from DigiCert, Inc. (security-libs/java.security); Added Three Root Certificates from eMudhra Technologies Limited (security-libs/java.security); Added Telia Root CA v2 Certificate (security-libs/java.security); Added ISRG Root X2 CA Certificate from Let's Encrypt (security-libs/java.security); Call X509KeyManager.chooseClientAlias Once for All Key Types (security-libs/javax.net.ssl); Bug fixes: 46 bug fixes
Java SE 17.0.11	2024-04-16	
Java SE 17.0.12	2024-07-16	
Java SE 17.0.13	2024-10-15	
Java SE 17.0.14	2025-01-21	
Java SE 17.0.15	2025-04-15	
Java SE 17.0.16	2025-07-15	
Java SE 17.0.17	2025-10-21	

== Java SE 18 ==
Java SE 18
- Released: 22 March 2022 (4 years ago)
- # of JEPs: 9

Addition(s)
- Notable: UTF by default; Javadoc code snippets
- Preview(s): Switch pattern matching
- Incubating: Vector API; Foreign function & memory API

Removal(s)
- Notable: Deprecated finalization for removal

Support ended
- Public: September 2022

JDK 18 was released on March 22, 2022.

- JEP 400: UTF-8 by Default
- JEP 408: Simple Web Server
- JEP 413: Code Snippets in Java API Documentation
- JEP 416: Reimplement Core Reflection with Method Handles
- JEP 417: Vector API (Third Incubator)
- JEP 418: Internet-Address Resolution SPI
- JEP 419: Foreign Function & Memory API (Second Incubator)
- JEP 420: Pattern Matching for switch (Second Preview)
- JEP 421: Deprecate Finalization for Removal

=== Java 18 updates ===
Table of Java 18 updates
Release	Release date	Highlights
Java SE 18	2022-03-22	Initial release
Java SE 18.0.1	2022-04-19	New features: New XML Processing Limits (xml/jaxp); Other notes: Only Expose Certificates With Proper Trust Settings as Trusted Certificate Entries in macOS KeychainStore (security-libs/java.security); Parsing of URL Strings in Built-in JNDI Providers Is More Strict (core-libs/javax.naming); Bug fixes: 18 bug fixes
Java SE 18.0.1.1	2022-05-02	core-libs/java.io: New System Property to Disable Windows Alternate Data Stream Support in java.io.File (core-libs/java.io); Bug fixes: 2 bug fixes
Java SE 18.0.2	2022-07-19	Removed features and options: Remove the Alternate ThreadLocal Implementation of the Subject::current and Subject::callAs APIs (security-libs/javax.security); Other notes: java.net.InetAddress Updated to Reject Ambiguous IPv4 Address Literals (core-libs/java.net); CPU Shares Ignored When Computing Active Processor Count (hotspot/runtime); Lambda Deserialization Fails for Object Method References on Interfaces (tools/javac); Bug fixes: 49 bug fixes
Java SE 18.0.2.1	2022-08-18	Changes: C2 Compilation Errors Unpredictably Crashes JVM (hotspot/compiler)

== Java SE 19 ==
Java SE 19
- Released: 20 September 2022 (4 years ago)
- # of JEPs: 7

Addition(s)
- Preview(s): Foreign function & memory API; Switch pattern matching
- Incubating: Vector API; Structured concurrency

Support ended
- Public: March 2023

JDK 19 was released on 20 September 2022.

- JEP 405: Record Patterns (Preview)
- JEP 422: Linux/RISC-V Port
- JEP 424: Foreign Function & Memory API (Preview)
- JEP 425: Virtual Threads (Preview)
- JEP 426: Vector API (Fourth Incubator)
- JEP 427: Pattern Matching for switch (Third Preview)
- JEP 428: Structured Concurrency (Incubator)

JEP 405 allows record patterns, extending the pattern matching capabilities of instanceof operators, and switch expressions, to include record patterns that explicitly refer to the components of the record.

record Rectangle(int x, int y, int w, int h) {}

int area(Object o) {
    if (o instanceof Rectangle(int x, int y, int w, int h)) {
        return w * h;
    }
    return 0;
}

Such patterns can include nested patterns, where the components of records are themselves records, allowing patterns to match more object graphs.

=== Java 19 updates ===
Table of Java 19 updates
Release	Release date	Highlights
Java SE 19	2022-09-20	Initial release
Java SE 19.0.1	2022-10-18	Other notes: Update Timezone Data to 2022c (core-libs/java.time); New System Property to Limit the Number of Open Connections to com.sun.net.httpserver.HttpServer (core-libs/java.net); Bug fixes: 6 bug fixes
Java SE 19.0.2	2023-01-17	New features: DTLS Resumption Uses HelloVerifyRequest Messages (security-libs/javax.net.ssl); Other notes: FXML JavaScript Engine Disabled by Default (javafx/fxml); Bug fixes: 28 bug fixes

== Java SE 20 ==
Java SE 20
- Released: 21 March 2023 (3 years ago)
- # of JEPs: 7

Addition(s)
- Incubating: Scoped values

Support ended
- Public: September 2023

Java 20 was released on 21 March 2023. All JEPs were either incubators or previews.

- JEP 429: Scoped Values (Incubator)
- JEP 432: Record Patterns (Second Preview)
- JEP 433: Pattern Matching for switch (Fourth Preview)
- JEP 434: Foreign Function & Memory API (Second Preview)
- JEP 436: Virtual Threads (Second Preview)
- JEP 437: Structured Concurrency (Second Incubator)
- JEP 438: Vector API (Fifth Incubator)

=== Java 20 updates ===
Table of Java 20 updates
Release	Release date	Highlights
Java SE 20	2023-03-21	Initial release
Java SE 20.0.1	2023-04-18	Other notes: System Property to Handle HTML ObjectView Creation (client-libs/javax.swing); Added Certigna(Dhimyotis) CA Certificate (security-libs/java.security); File::listRoots Changed to Return All Available Drives on Windows (core-libs/java.io); Bug fixes: 5 bug fixes
Java SE 20.0.2	2023-07-18	New features: Support for GB18030-2022 (core-libs/java.nio.charsets); Known issues: Problem Upgrading JDK on Windows if System User Is Using Shared Files (install); Other notes: Missing /usr/java/default Symlink on Linux Restored (install/install); Installation of JDK RPM Corrupts Alternatives (install/install); Added TWCA Root CA Certificate (security-libs/java.security); Added 4 GTS Root CA Certificates (security-libs/java.security); Added Microsoft Corporation's 2 TLS Root CA Certificates (security-libs/java.security); ASLR Support for CDS Archive (hotspot/runtime); New System Property to Control the Maximum Size of Signature Files (security-libs/java.security); Improved ZIP64 Extra Field Validation (core-libs/java.util.jar); Bug fixes: 33 bug fixes

== Java SE 21 (LTS) ==
Java SE 21
- LTS version
- Released: 19 September 2023 (3 years ago)
- # of JEPs: 15

Addition(s)
- Notable: Record patterns, pattern matching for switch, virtual threads
- Preview(s): String templates, unnamed classes and main methods
- Incubating: Vector API

Java 21 was released on 19 September 2023. The 32-bit version of Java for Windows on x86 was deprecated for removal with this release. The following JEPs were added, including eight JEPs that graduated from the incubating and preview stages, compared to Java 20 which only had previewing and incubating JEPs. Java 21 introduces features first previewed in Java 17 (pattern matching for switch statements) and Java 19 (record patterns). All JEPs added with Java 21 include the following:

1. JEP 430: String Templates (Preview)
2. JEP 431: Sequenced Collections
3. JEP 439: Generational ZGC
4. JEP 440: Record Patterns
5. JEP 441: Pattern Matching for switch
6. JEP 442: Foreign Function & Memory API (Third Preview)
7. JEP 443: Unnamed Patterns and Variables (Preview)
8. JEP 444: Virtual Threads
9. JEP 445: Unnamed Classes and Instance Main Methods (Preview)
10. JEP 446: Scoped Values (Preview)
11. JEP 448: Vector API (Sixth Incubator)
12. JEP 449: Deprecate the Windows 32-bit x86 Port for Removal
13. JEP 451: Prepare to Disallow the Dynamic Loading of Agents
14. JEP 452: Key Encapsulation Mechanism API
15. JEP 453: Structured Concurrency (Preview)

JEP 445, previewing unnamed classes, allows for a barebones Main class without boilerplate code:

void main() {
    System.out.println("Hello, World!");
}

instead of :

public class HelloWorld {
    public static void main(String[] args) {
        System.out.println("Hello, World!");
    }
}

=== Java 21 updates ===
Table of Java 21 updates
Release	Release date	Highlights
Java SE 21	2023-09-19	Initial release
Java SE 21.0.1	2023-10-17	Other notes: Added Certigna Root CA Certificate (security-libs/java.security); Increase Default Value of the System Property jdk.jar.maxSignatureFileSize (security-libs/java.security); Bug fixes: 40 bug fixes
Java SE 21.0.2	2024-01-16	New features: TCP_KEEPxxxx Extended Socket Options Are Now Supported on the Windows Platform (core-libs/java.net); Known issues: Potential Performance Regression Due to Limited Range Check Elimination (hotspot/compiler); Issues fixed: ZGC: Reintroduced Support for Non-Default ObjectAlignmentInBytes (hotspot/compiler); Other notes: Added Four Root Certificates from DigiCert, Inc. (security-libs/java.security); Added Three Root Certificates from eMudhra Technologies Limited (security-libs/java.security); Added Telia Root CA v2 Certificate (security-libs/java.security); Added ISRG Root X2 CA Certificate from Let's Encrypt (security-libs/java.security); NMT: Make Peak Values Available in Release Builds (hotspot/runtime); Add User Facing Warning If THPs Are Enabled but Cannot Be Used (hotspot/runtime); Bug fixes: 74 bug fixes
Java SE 21.0.3	2024-04-16	New features: Update XML Security for Java to 3.0.3 (security-libs/javax.crypto); Known issues: jpackage Apps May Fail to Build on Debian Linux Distros Due to Missing Shared Libraries (tools/jpackage); Other notes: AWT SystemTray API Is Not Supported on Most Linux Desktops (client-libs/java.awt); Added Certainly R1 and E1 Root Certificates (security-libs/java.security); Align javac with the Java Language Specification by Rejecting final in Record Patterns (tools/javac); Updates to Third Party Libraries: FreeType 2.13.2 (java.desktop); Xalan Java 2.7.3 (java.xml); XML Security for Java 3.0.3 (java.xml.crypto); Bug fixes: 27 bug fixes
Java SE 21.0.4	2024-07-16	
Java SE 21.0.5	2024-10-15	
Java SE 21.0.6	2025-01-21	
Java SE 21.0.7	2025-04-15	
Java SE 21.0.8	2025-07-25	
Java SE 21.0.9	2025-10-21	

== Java SE 22 ==
Java SE 22
- Released: 19 March 2024 (2 years ago)
- # of JEPs: 12

Addition(s)
- Notable: Foreign function and memory API, unnamed variables and patterns
- Preview(s): Structured concurrency, string templates
- Incubating: Vector API

Support ended
- Public: September 2024

Java 22 was released on 19 March 2024. The following features, or JEPs, were added with this release:

1. JEP 423: Region Pinning for G1
2. JEP 447: Statements before super(...) (Preview)
3. JEP 454: Foreign Function & Memory API
4. JEP 456: Unnamed Variables & Patterns
5. JEP 457: Class-File API (Preview)
6. JEP 458: Launch Multi-File Source-Code Programs
7. JEP 459: String Templates (Second Preview)
8. JEP 460: Vector API (Seventh Incubator)
9. JEP 461: Stream Gatherers (Preview)
10. JEP 462: Structured Concurrency (Second Preview)
11. JEP 463: Implicitly Declared Classes and Instance Main Methods (Second Preview)
12. JEP 464: Scoped Values (Second Preview)

An API related to Java's threading implementation, java.lang.Thread.countStackFrames, was removed.

== Java SE 23 ==
Java SE 23
- Released: 17 September 2024 (2 years ago)
- # of JEPs: 12

Addition(s)
- Notable: Markdown documentation comments
- Preview(s): Primitive types in Patterns, instanceof, and switch, Class-File API, Stream Gatherers, Module import declarations, Implicitly declared classes and instance main methods, structured concurrency, scoped values, flexible constructor bodies
- Incubating: Vector API

Java 23 was released on 17 September 2024, with the following JEPs:

1. JEP 455: Primitive Types in Patterns, instanceof, and switch (Preview)
2. JEP 466: Class-File API (Second Preview)
3. JEP 467: Markdown Documentation Comments
4. JEP 469: Vector API (Eighth Incubator)
5. JEP 473: Stream Gatherers (Second Preview)
6. JEP 471: Deprecate the Memory-Access Methods in sun.misc.Unsafe for Removal
7. JEP 474: ZGC: Generational Mode by Default
8. JEP 476: Module Import Declarations (Preview)
9. JEP 477: Implicitly Declared Classes and Instance Main Methods (Third Preview)
10. JEP 480: Structured Concurrency (Third Preview)
11. JEP 481: Scoped Values (Third Preview)
12. JEP 482: Flexible Constructor Bodies (Second Preview)

The String Templates preview feature was removed in Java 23 due to issues with the design of the feature.

== Java SE 24 ==
Java SE 24
- Released: 18 March 2025 (20 months ago)
- # of JEPs: 24

The specification for Java 24 was finalized in December 2024, with 24 JEPs making it into the release and it was released on 18 March 2025.

The following JEPs were targeted to this version of Java SE:

1. JEP 404: Generational Shenandoah (Experimental)
2. JEP 450: Compact Object Headers (Experimental) (formerly known as Project Lilliput)
3. JEP 472: Prepare to Restrict the Use of JNI
4. JEP 475: Late Barrier Expansion for G1
5. JEP 478: Key Derivation Function API (Preview)
6. JEP 479: Remove the Windows 32-bit x86 Port
7. JEP 483: Ahead-of-Time Class Loading & Linking
8. JEP 484: Class-File API
9. JEP 485: Stream Gatherers
10. JEP 486: Permanently Disable the Security Manager
11. JEP 487: Scoped Values (Fourth Preview)
12. JEP 488: Primitive Types in Patterns, instanceof, and switch (Second Preview)
13. JEP 489: Vector API (Ninth Incubator)
14. JEP 490: ZGC: Remove the Non-Generational Mode
15. JEP 491: Synchronize Virtual Threads without Pinning
16. JEP 492: Flexible Constructor Bodies (Third Preview)
17. JEP 493: Linking Run-Time Images without JMODs
18. JEP 494: Module Import Declarations (Second Preview)
19. JEP 495: Simple Source Files and Instance Main Methods (Fourth Preview)
20. JEP 496: Quantum-Resistant Module-Lattice-Based Key Encapsulation Mechanism
21. JEP 497: Quantum-Resistant Module-Lattice-Based Digital Signature Algorithm
22. JEP 498: Warn upon Use of Memory-Access Methods in sun.misc.Unsafe
23. JEP 499: Structured Concurrency (Fourth Preview)
24. JEP 501: Deprecate the 32-bit x86 Port for Removal

Java SE 24 is the last release of Java to officially support the 32-bit x86 edition of Microsoft Windows 10.

== Java SE 25 (LTS) ==
Java SE 25
- LTS version
- Released: 16 September 2025 (14 months ago)
- # of JEPs: 18

Addition(s)
- Notable: Module Import Declarations; Flexible Constructor Bodies
- Preview(s): Primitive Types in Patterns, instanceof, and switch; PEM Encodings of Cryptographic Objects

Removal(s)
- Notable: 32-bit x86 Port

The specification for Java 25 was finalized in July 2025, with 18 JEPs making it into the release. Java 25 was released on September 16, 2025.

1. JEP 470: PEM Encodings of Cryptographic Objects (Preview)
2. JEP 502: Stable Values (Preview)
3. JEP 503: Remove the 32-bit x86 Port
4. JEP 505: Structured Concurrency (Fifth Preview)
5. JEP 506: Scoped Values
6. JEP 507: Primitive Types in Patterns, instanceof, and switch (Third Preview)
7. JEP 508: Vector API (Tenth Incubator)
8. JEP 509: JFR CPU-Time Profiling (Experimental)
9. JEP 510: Key Derivation Function API
10. JEP 511: Module Import Declarations
11. JEP 512: Compact Source Files and Instance Main Methods
12. JEP 513: Flexible Constructor Bodies
13. JEP 514: Ahead-of-Time Command-Line Ergonomics
14. JEP 515: Ahead-of-Time Method Profiling
15. JEP 518: JFR Cooperative Sampling
16. JEP 519: Compact Object Headers
17. JEP 520: JFR Method Timing & Tracing
18. JEP 521: Generational Shenandoah

== Java SE 26 ==
Java SE 26
- Released: 17 March 2026 (8 months ago)
- # of JEPs: 10

Removal(s)
- Notable: Applet API

The specification for Java 26 was finalized in December 2025, with 10 JEPs making it into the release. Java 26 was released on March 17, 2026.

The following JEPs were targeted to this release of Java SE:

1. JEP 500: Prepare to Make Final Mean Final
2. JEP 504: Remove the Applet API
3. JEP 516: Ahead-of-Time Object Caching with Any GC
4. JEP 517: HTTP/3 for the HTTP Client API
5. JEP 522: G1 GC: Improve Throughput by Reducing Synchronization
6. JEP 524: PEM Encodings of Cryptographic Objects (Second Preview)
7. JEP 525: Structured Concurrency (Sixth Preview)
8. JEP 526: Lazy Constants (Second Preview)
9. JEP 529: Vector API (Eleventh Incubator)
10. JEP 530: Primitive Types in Patterns, instanceof, and switch (Fourth Preview)

Java 26 removes support for creating Java applets with the Applet API, after having been deprecated since the release of Java 17 in September 2021.

== Java SE 27 ==
Java SE 27
- Released: 15 September 2026 (2 months ago)
- # of JEPs: 9

Addition(s)
- Notable: Post-Quantum Hybrid Key Exchange
- Preview(s): Lazy Constants, Primitive Types in Patterns, Structured Concurrency, PEM Encodings of Cryptographic Objects
- Incubating: Vector API

Removal(s)
- Notable: Legacy TLS key exchange, Legacy object headers

The specification for Java 27 was finalized in August 2026, with 9 JEPs making it into the release. It was released on September 15, 2026.

The following JEPs were targeted to this release of Java SE:

1. JEP 523: Make G1 the Default Garbage Collector in All Environments
2. JEP 527: Post-Quantum Hybrid Key Exchange for TLS 1.3
3. JEP 531: Lazy Constants (Third Preview)
4. JEP 532: Primitive Types in Patterns, instanceof, and switch (Fifth Preview)
5. JEP 533: Structured Concurrency (Seventh Preview)
6. JEP 534: Compact Object Headers by Default
7. JEP 536: JFR In-Process Data Redaction
8. JEP 537: Vector API (Twelfth Incubator)
9. JEP 538: PEM Encodings of Cryptographic Objects (Third Preview)

Java 27 removes several outdated key exchange algorithms from default security providers. It also removes legacy object header formats when running on supported platforms. It deprecates non-compact object headers, non-hybrid TLS key exchange algorithms, and old APIs related to PEM parsing.

== Future features ==
- Project Valhalla: Value classes, whose objects lack identity, but can in certain cases get an improved memory layout (with less indirection), or have their allocation optimized away entirely.
- Vector API, a portable and relatively low-level abstraction layer for SIMD programming. Its stabilization is dependent on Project Valhalla.
- Secondary goal of Project Lilliput: Reduce the size of Java object headers down to 32 bits.
- Reducing startup time and warm-up time (time to peak performance) in JIT mode:
  - CRaC Project enables making snapshots of whole JVM (together with the running application) and restoring it with necessary adjustments (reopening files, sockets, etc).
  - Project Leyden, among other things, will allow partial or (in the long term) full AOT compiling, reducing overall dynamism (by adopting so called "closed-world constraints") to reduce dynamic compiling overhead.
- Project Babylon aims to extend the Java language's reach to alternative programming models with an enhancement to its reflective programming abilities, called code reflection (i.e., reflection over code itself). The stated main goal is to run Java code on GPUs, with SQL and other programming models as secondary targets.

== Implementations ==
The officially supported Java platform, first developed at Sun and now stewarded by Oracle, is Java SE. Releases are based on the OpenJDK project, a free and open-source project with an open development model. Other Java implementations exist, however—in part due to Java's early history as proprietary software. In contrast, some implementations were created to offer some benefits over the standard implementation, often the result of some area of academic or corporate-sponsored research. A number of Linux distributions include builds of OpenJDK through the IcedTea project started by Red Hat, which provides a more straightforward build and integration environment.

Visual J++ and the Microsoft Java Virtual Machine were created as incompatible implementations. After the Sun v. Microsoft lawsuit, Microsoft abandoned it and began work on the .NET platform. In 2021, Microsoft started distributing compatible "Microsoft Build of OpenJDK" for Java 11 first then also for Java 17. Their builds support not only Windows, but also Linux and macOS.

Other proprietary Java implementations are available, such as Azul's Zing. Azul offers certified open source OpenJDK builds under the Zulu moniker.

Prior to the release of OpenJDK, while Sun's implementation was still proprietary, the GNU Classpath project was created to provide a free and open-source implementation of the Java platform. Since the release of JDK 7, when OpenJDK became the official reference implementation, the original motivation for the GNU Classpath project almost completely disappeared, and its last release was in 2012.

The Apache Harmony project was started shortly before the release of OpenJDK. After Sun's initial source code release, the Harmony project continued, working to provide an implementation under a lax license, in contrast to the protective license chosen for OpenJDK. Google later developed Android and released it under a lax license. Android incorporated parts of the Harmony project, supplemented with Google's own Dalvik virtual machine and ART. Apache Harmony has since been retired, and Google has switched its Harmony components with equivalent ones from OpenJDK.

Both Jikes and Jikes RVM are open-source research projects that IBM developed.

Several other implementations exist that started as proprietary software, but are now open source. IBM initially developed OpenJ9 as the proprietary J9, but has since relicensed the project and donated it to the Eclipse Foundation. JRockit is a proprietary implementation that was acquired by Oracle and incorporated into subsequent OpenJDK versions.

=== Most commonly used implementations in 2025 ===
Amazon developed Corretto, a no-cost, multiplatform, production-ready distribution of OpenJDK with long-term support that includes performance enhancements and security fixes. Corretto is certified as compatible with the Java SE standard and is used internally at Amazon for a number of production services.

The Eclipse Temurin project, formerly known as AdoptOpenJDK, provides prebuilt OpenJDK binaries from a fully open source build farm. The project transitioned to the Eclipse Foundation in 2021 as part of the Adoptium Working Group, which ensures high-quality, vendor-neutral Java runtime distributions.

BellSoft Liberica JDK is another OpenJDK-based implementation that provides builds for a wide range of platforms, including support for embedded systems and older architectures. It offers both standard and "Full" versions that include additional components like JavaFX.

SAP Machine is SAP's downstream distribution of OpenJDK, optimized for SAP applications and deployments. It provides both short-term and long-term support releases aligned with OpenJDK's release schedule.

Alibaba Dragonwell is a downstream version of OpenJDK with some in-house optimizations. It includes enhancements in startup performance, footprint, and throughput.

GraalVM represents a significant departure from traditional Java implementations. Developed by Oracle Labs, it provides a polyglot virtual machine supporting multiple languages beyond Java, including JavaScript, Python, Ruby, and R. GraalVM includes an advanced just-in-time compiler written in Java and supports ahead-of-time compilation for creating native executables, substantially reducing startup time and memory footprint.

The Red Hat build of OpenJDK is Red Hat's supported distribution of OpenJDK for Red Hat Enterprise Linux and Windows, providing long-term support and regular updates as part of Red Hat's subscription offerings.

The Semeru Runtime, based on the Eclipse OpenJ9 JVM and OpenJDK class libraries, is IBM's no-cost Java runtime optimized for cloud deployments. It offers improved startup time, smaller memory footprint, and better throughput compared to HotSpot-based implementations.
