= JDK Enhancement Proposal =

Process for proposals to the Java language

The JDK Enhancement Proposal (or JEP) is a process drafted by Oracle Corporation for collecting proposals for enhancements to the Java Development Kit and OpenJDK.

According to Oracle, JEPs "serve as the long-term Roadmap for JDK Release Projects and related efforts".

== Relationships with the JCP ==
The JEP process is not intended to replace the Java Community Process, which is still required to approve changes in the Java API or language but rather to allow for OpenJDK committers to work more informally before becoming a formal Java Specification Request.

== See also ==
- Java platform
- Java Community Process
