= SwingWorker =

Event-dispatching UI utility class for Java Swing

SwingWorker (in full javax.swing.SwingWorker is a utility class developed by Sun Microsystems for the Swing library of the Java programming language. SwingWorker enables proper use of the event dispatching thread. As of Java 6, javax.swing.SwingWorker is included in the JRE. It resides in the module java.desktop.

Several incompatible, unofficial, versions of SwingWorker were produced from 1998 to 2006, and care must be taken to avoid the abundant documentation on these versions predating Java 6.

Its equivalents include System.ComponentModel.BackgroundWorker in .NET Framework, flash.system.Worker in Adobe Flash, and android.os.AsyncTask in Android.

== Usage in Java 6.0 ==
=== The event dispatching thread problem ===
SwingWorker is useful when a time-consuming task has to be performed following a user-interaction event (for example, parsing a huge XML file, on pressing a javax.swing.JButton). The most straightforward way to do it is (assuming the loadXml() method is the method in question):

import javax.swing.JButton;
import javax.swing.action.ActionEvent;
import javax.swing.action.ActionListener;
import javax.swing.text.Document;

Document doc;
// ...
JButton button = new JButton("Open XML");
button.addActionListener(new ActionListener() {
    @Override
    public void actionPerformed(ActionEvent e) {
        doc = loadXml();
    }
});

This will work, but unfortunately, the loadXml() method will be called in the same thread as the main Swing thread (the event dispatching thread), so if the method needs time to perform, the GUI will freeze during this time.

=== SwingWorker solution ===
This problem is not specific to Java, but common to many GUI models. SwingWorker proposes a way to solve it by performing the time-consuming task on another background thread, keeping the GUI responsive during this time.

==== Creating the worker ====
The following code defines the SwingWorker, which encapsulates the loadXml() method call :

import javax.swing.SwingWorker;
import javax.swing.text.Document;

SwingWorker worker = new SwingWorker<Document, Void>() {
    @Override
    public Document doInBackground() {
        Document intDoc = loadXml();
        // ...
        return intDoc;
    }
};

==== Worker execution ====
Execution is started by using the SwingWorker.execute() method.

==== Retrieving the result ====
The result can be retrieved by using the SwingWorker.get() method.

As calling get() on the Event Dispatch Thread blocks all events, including repaints, from being processed until the task completes, one must avoid calling it before the lengthy operation has finished. There are two ways to retrieve the result after the task completion :

- override the SwingWorker.done() method. This method is called on the main event dispatching thread.

import java.util.concurrent.ExecutionException;
import javax.swing.SwingWorker;
import javax.swing.text.Document;

Document doc;
// ...
SwingWorker<Document, Void> worker = new SwingWorker<Document, Void>() {
    @Override
    public Document doInBackground() {
        Document intDoc = loadXml();
        // ...
        return intDoc;
    }

    @Override
    public void done() {
        try {
            doc = get();
        } catch (InterruptedException ex) {
            ex.printStackTrace();
        } catch (ExecutionException ex) {
            ex.printStackTrace();
        }
    }
}

- register a listener by using the worker SwingWorker.addPropertyChangeListener(PropertyChangeListener) method. The listener will be notified of changes in the worker state.

==== Complete Worker example ====
import java.util.concurrent.ExecutionException;
import javax.swing.JButton;
import javax.swing.SwingWorker;
import javax.swing.action.ActionEvent;
import javax.swing.action.ActionListener;
import javax.swing.text.Document;

Document doc;
// ...
JButton button = new JButton("Open XML");
button.addActionListener(new ActionListener() {
    @Override
    public void actionPerformed(ActionEvent e) {
        SwingWorker<Document, Void> worker = new SwingWorker<Document, Void>() {
            @Override
            public Document doInBackground() {
                Document intDoc = loadXml();
                // ...
                return intDoc;
            }

            @Override
            public void done() {
                try {
                    doc = get();
                } catch (InterruptedException ex) {
                    ex.printStackTrace();
                } catch (ExecutionException ex) {
                    ex.printStackTrace();
                }
            }
        };
        worker.execute();
    }
});

== History: Usage before Java 6.0 ==
SwingWorker has been part of Java SE only since Java 6.0. Sun has released versions to be used with earlier JDKs, although they were unofficial versions which were not part of the Java SE and were not mentioned in the standard library documentation. The most recent of these versions dates from 2003 and is often referred to as SwingWorker version 3. Unfortunately, the JDK 6.0 SwingWorker and the Version 3 SwingWorker use different method names and are not compatible. The backport version (see below) is now recommended for pre-Java 6 usage.

An example for instantiating SwingWorker 3 is shown below:

import javax.swing.SwingWorker;

SwingWorker worker = new SwingWorker() {
    public Object construct() {
        // the code for the background thread
    }
    public void finished() {
        // code that runs in the UI thread
    } 
};

worker.start(); // Starts the background thread

The start() method executes the code added in the construct() method in a separate thread.

To be alerted when the background thread finishes, one need only override the finished() method. The construct() method can return a result which can later be retrieved using SwingWorker's get() method.

=== Backport of the Java 6 SwingWorker ===
A backport of the Java 6 SwingWorker to Java 5 is available at http://swingworker.java.net/. Apart from residing in package org.jdesktop.swingworker, it is compatible with the Java 6 SwingWorker.
