= Java performance =

Aspect of Java programming language

In software development, the programming language Java was historically considered slower than the fastest third-generation typed languages such as C and C++. In contrast to those languages, Java compiles by default to a Java Virtual Machine (JVM) with operations distinct from those of the actual computer hardware. Early JVM implementations were interpreters; they simulated the virtual operations one-by-one rather than translating them into machine code for direct hardware execution.

Since the late 1990s, the execution speed of Java programs improved significantly via introduction of just-in-time compilation (JIT) (in 1997 for Java 1.1), the addition of language features supporting better code analysis, and optimizations in the JVM (such as HotSpot becoming the default for Sun's JVM in 2000). Sophisticated garbage collection strategies were also an area of improvement. Hardware execution of Java bytecode, such as that offered by ARM's Jazelle, was explored but not deployed.

The performance of a Java bytecode compiled Java program depends on how optimally its given tasks are managed by the host Java virtual machine (JVM), and how well the JVM exploits the features of the computer hardware and operating system (OS) in doing so. Thus, any Java performance test or comparison has to always report the version, vendor, OS and hardware architecture of the used JVM. In a similar manner, the performance of the equivalent natively compiled program will depend on the quality of its generated machine code, so the test or comparison also has to report the name, version and vendor of the used compiler, and its activated compiler optimization directives.

== Virtual machine optimization methods ==
Many optimizations have improved the performance of the JVM over time. However, although Java was often the first virtual machine to implement them successfully, they have often been used in other similar platforms as well.

=== Just-in-time compiling ===
Early JVMs always interpreted Java bytecodes. This had a large performance penalty of between a factor 10 and 20 for Java versus C in average applications. To combat this, a just-in-time (JIT) compiler was introduced into Java 1.1. Due to the high cost of compiling, an added system called HotSpot was introduced in Java 1.2 and was made the default in Java 1.3. Using this framework, the Java virtual machine continually analyses program performance for hot spots which are executed frequently or repeatedly. These are then targeted for optimizing, leading to high performance execution with a minimum of overhead for less performance-critical code. Some benchmarks show a 10-fold speed gain by this means. However, due to time constraints, the compiler cannot fully optimize the program, and thus the resulting program is slower than native code alternatives.

=== Adaptive optimizing ===
Adaptive optimizing is a method in computer science that performs dynamic recompilation of parts of a program based on the current execution profile. With a simple implementation, an adaptive optimizer may simply make a trade-off between just-in-time compiling and interpreting instructions. At another level, adaptive optimizing may exploit local data conditions to optimize away branches and use inline expansion.

A Java virtual machine like HotSpot can also deoptimize code formerly JITed. This allows performing aggressive (and potentially unsafe) optimizations, while still being able to later deoptimize the code and fall back to a safe path.

=== Garbage collection ===
The 1.0 and 1.1 Java virtual machines (JVMs) used a mark-sweep collector, which could fragment the heap after a garbage collection. Starting with Java 1.2, the JVMs changed to a generational collector, which has a much better defragmentation behaviour. Modern JVMs use a variety of methods that have further improved garbage collection performance.

=== Other optimizing methods ===
==== Compressed Oops ====
Compressed Oops allow Java 5.0+ to address up to 32 GB of heap with 32-bit references. Java does not support access to individual bytes, only objects which are 8-byte aligned by default. Because of this, the lowest 3 bits of a heap reference will always be 0. By lowering the resolution of 32-bit references to 8 byte blocks, the addressable space can be increased to 32 GB. This significantly reduces memory use compared to using 64-bit references as Java uses references much more than some languages like C++. Java 8 supports larger alignments such as 16-byte alignment to support up to 64 GB with 32-bit references.

==== Split bytecode verification ====
Before executing a class, the Sun JVM verifies its Java bytecodes (see bytecode verifier). This verification is performed lazily: classes' bytecodes are only loaded and verified when the specific class is loaded and prepared for use, and not at the beginning of the program. However, as the Java class libraries are also regular Java classes, they must also be loaded when they are used, which means that the start-up time of a Java program is often longer than for C++ programs, for example.

A method named split-time verification, first introduced in the Java Platform, Micro Edition (J2ME), is used in the JVM since Java version 6. It splits the verification of Java bytecode in two phases:

- Design-time – when compiling a class from source to bytecode
- Runtime – when loading a class.

In practice this method works by capturing knowledge that the Java compiler has of class flow and annotating the compiled method bytecodes with a synopsis of the class flow information. This does not make runtime verification appreciably less complex, but does allow some shortcuts.

==== Escape analysis and lock coarsening ====
Java is able to manage multithreading at the language level. Multithreading allows programs to perform multiple processes concurrently, thus improving the performance for programs running on computer systems with multiple processors or cores. Also, a multithreaded application can remain responsive to input, even while performing long running tasks.

However, programs that use multithreading need to take extra care of objects shared between threads, locking access to shared methods or blocks when they are used by one of the threads. Locking a block or an object is a time-consuming operation due to the nature of the underlying operating system-level operation involved (see concurrency control and lock granularity).

As the Java library does not know which methods will be used by more than one thread, the standard library always locks blocks when needed in a multithreaded environment.

Before Java 6, the virtual machine always locked objects and blocks when asked to by the program, even if there was no risk of an object being modified by two different threads at once. For example, in this case, a local Vector was locked before each of the add operations to ensure that it would not be modified by other threads (Vector is synchronized), but because it is strictly local to the method this is needless:

public String getNames() {
     final Vector<String> v = new Vector<>();
     v.add("Me");
     v.add("You");
     v.add("Her");
     return v.toString();
}

Starting with Java 6, code blocks and objects are locked only when needed, so in the above case, the virtual machine would not lock the Vector object at all.

Since version 6u23, Java includes support for escape analysis.

==== Register allocation improvements ====
Before Java 6, allocation of registers was very primitive in the client virtual machine (they did not live across blocks), which was a problem in CPU designs which had fewer processor registers available, as in x86s. If there are no more registers available for an operation, the compiler must copy from register to memory (or memory to register), which takes time (registers are significantly faster to access). However, the server virtual machine used a color-graph allocator and did not have this problem.

An optimization of register allocation was introduced in Sun's JDK 6; it was then possible to use the same registers across blocks (when applicable), reducing accesses to the memory. This led to a reported performance gain of about 60% in some benchmarks.

==== Class data sharing ====
Class data sharing (called CDS by Sun) is a mechanism which reduces the startup time for Java applications, and also reduces memory footprint. When the JRE is installed, the installer loads a set of classes from the system JAR file (the JAR file holding all the Java class library, called rt.jar) into a private internal representation, and dumps that representation to a file, called a "shared archive". During subsequent JVM invocations, this shared archive is memory-mapped in, saving the cost of loading those classes and allowing much of the JVM's metadata for these classes to be shared among multiple JVM processes.

The corresponding improvement in start-up time is more obvious for small programs.

== History of performance improvements ==
Apart from the improvements listed here, each release of Java introduced many performance improvements in the JVM and Java application programming interface (API).

JDK 1.1.6: First just-in-time compilation (Symantec's JIT-compiler)

J2SE 1.2: Use of a generational collector.

J2SE 1.3: Just-in-time compiling by HotSpot.

J2SE 1.4: See here, for a Sun overview of performance improvements between 1.3 and 1.4 versions.

Java SE 5.0: Class data sharing

Java SE 6:

- Split bytecode verification
- Escape analysis and lock coarsening
- Register allocation improvements

Other improvements:

- Java OpenGL Java 2D pipeline speed improvements
- Java 2D performance also improved significantly in Java 6

See also 'Sun overview of performance improvements between Java 5 and Java 6'.

=== Java SE 6 Update 10 ===
- Java Quick Starter reduces application start-up time by preloading part of JRE data at OS startup on disk cache.
- Parts of the platform needed to execute an application accessed from the web when JRE is not installed are now downloaded first. The full JRE is 12 MB, a typical Swing application only needs to download 4 MB to start. The remaining parts are then downloaded in the background.
- Graphics performance on Windows improved by extensively using Direct3D by default, and use shaders on graphics processing unit (GPU) to accelerate complex Java 2D operations.

=== Java 7 ===
Several performance improvements have been released for Java 7: Future performance improvements are planned for an update of Java 6 or Java 7:

- Provide JVM support for dynamic programming languages, following the prototyping work currently done on the Da Vinci Machine (Multi Language Virtual Machine),
- Enhance the existing concurrency library by managing parallel computing on multi-core processors,
- Allow the JVM to use both the client and server JIT compilers in the same session with a method called tiered compiling:
  - The client would be used at startup (because it is good at startup and for small applications),
  - The server would be used for long-term running of the application (because it outperforms the client compiler for this).
- Replace the existing concurrent low-pause garbage collector (also called concurrent mark-sweep (CMS) collector) by a new collector called Garbage First (G1) to ensure consistent pauses over time.

== Comparison to other languages ==
Objectively comparing the performance of a Java program and an equivalent one written in another language such as C++ needs a carefully and thoughtfully constructed benchmark which compares programs completing identical tasks. The target platform of Java's bytecode compiler is the Java platform, and the bytecode is either interpreted or compiled into machine code by the JVM. Other compilers almost always target a specific hardware and software platform, producing machine code that will stay virtually unchanged during execution. Very different and hard-to-compare scenarios arise from these two different approaches: static vs. dynamic compilations and recompilations, the availability of precise information about the runtime environment and others.

Java is often compiled just-in-time at runtime by the Java virtual machine, but may also be compiled ahead-of-time, as is C++. When compiled just-in-time, the micro-benchmarks of The Computer Language Benchmarks Game indicate the following about its performance:

- slower than compiled languages such as C or C++,
- similar to other just-in-time compiled languages such as C#,
- much faster than languages without an effective native-code compiler (JIT or AOT), such as Perl, Ruby, PHP and Python.

=== Program speed ===
Benchmarks often measure performance for small numerically intensive programs. In some rare real-life programs, Java out-performs C. One example is the benchmark of Jake2 (a clone of Quake II written in Java by translating the original GPL C code). The Java 5.0 version performs better in some hardware configurations than its C counterpart. While it is not specified how the data was measured (for example if the original Quake II executable compiled in 1997 was used, which may be considered bad as current C compilers may achieve better optimizations for Quake), it notes how the same Java source code can have a huge speed boost just by updating the VM, something impossible to achieve with a 100% static approach.

For other programs, the C++ counterpart can, and usually does, run significantly faster than the Java equivalent. A benchmark performed by Google in 2011 showed a factor 10 between C++ and Java. At the other extreme, an academic benchmark performed in 2012 with a 3D modelling algorithm showed the Java 6 JVM being from 1.09 to 1.91 times slower than C++ under Windows.

Some optimizations that are possible in Java and similar languages may not be possible in certain circumstances in C++:

- C-style pointer use can hinder optimizing in languages that support pointers,
- The use of escape analysis methods is limited in C++, for example, because a C++ compiler does not always know if an object will be modified in a given block of code due to pointers, (Note: Contention of this nature can be alleviated in C++ programs at the source code level by employing advanced methods such as custom allocators, exploiting precisely the kind of low-level coding complexity that Java was designed to conceal and encapsulate; however, this approach is rarely practical if not adopted (or at least anticipated) while the program remains under primary development.)
- Java can access derived instance methods faster than C++ can access derived virtual methods due to C++'s extra virtual-table look-up. However, non-virtual methods in C++ do not suffer from v-table performance bottlenecks, and thus exhibit performance similar to Java.

The JVM is also able to perform processor specific optimizations or inline expansion. And, the ability to deoptimize code already compiled or inlined sometimes allows it to perform more aggressive optimizations than those performed by statically typed languages when external library functions are involved.

Results for microbenchmarks between Java and C++ highly depend on which operations are compared. For example, when comparing with Java 5.0:

- 32- and 64-bit arithmetic operations, file input/output, and exception handling have a similar performance to comparable C++ programs
- Operations on arrays have better performance in C.
- The performance of trigonometric functions is much better in C.

=== Multi-core performance ===
The scalability and performance of Java applications on multi-core systems is limited by the object allocation rate. This effect is sometimes called an "allocation wall". However, in practice, modern garbage collector algorithms use multiple cores to perform garbage collection, which to some degree alleviates this problem. Some garbage collectors are reported to sustain allocation rates of over a gigabyte per second, and there exist Java-based systems that have no problems scaling to several hundreds of CPU cores and heaps sized several hundreds of GB.

Automatic memory management in Java allows for efficient use of lockless and immutable data structures that are extremely hard or sometimes impossible to implement without some kind of a garbage collection. Java offers a number of such high-level structures in its standard library in the java.util.concurrent package, while many languages historically used for high performance systems like C or C++ are still lacking them.

=== Startup time ===
Java startup time is often much slower than many languages, including C, C++, Perl or Python, because many classes (and first of all classes from the platform Class libraries) must be loaded before being used.

When compared against similar popular runtimes, for small programs running on a Windows machine, the startup time appears to be similar to Mono's and a little slower than .NET's.

It seems that much of the startup time is due to input-output (IO) bound operations rather than JVM initialization or class loading (the rt.jar class data file alone is 40 MB and the JVM must seek much data in this big file). Some tests showed that although the new split bytecode verification method improved class loading by roughly 40%, it only realized about 5% startup improvement for large programs.

Albeit a small improvement, it is more visible in small programs that perform a simple operation and then exit, because the Java platform data loading can represent many times the load of the actual program's operation.

Starting with Java SE 6 Update 10, the Sun JRE comes with a Quick Starter that preloads class data at OS startup to get data from the disk cache rather than from the disk.

Excelsior JET approaches the problem from the other side. Its Startup Optimizer reduces the amount of data that must be read from the disk on application startup, and makes the reads more sequential.

In November 2004, Nailgun, a "client, protocol, and server for running Java programs from the command line without incurring the JVM startup overhead" was publicly released. introducing for the first time an option for scripts to use a JVM as a daemon, for running one or more Java applications with no JVM startup overhead. The Nailgun daemon is insecure: "all programs are run with the same permissions as the server". Where multi-user security is needed, Nailgun is inappropriate without special precautions. Scripts where per-application JVM startup dominates resource use, see one to two order of magnitude runtime performance improvements.

=== Memory use ===
Java memory use is much higher than C++'s memory use because:

- There is an overhead of 8 bytes for each object and 12 bytes for each array in Java. If the size of an object is not a multiple of 8 bytes, it is rounded up to next multiple of 8. This means an object holding one byte field occupies 16 bytes and needs a 4-byte reference. C++ also allocates a pointer (usually 4 or 8 bytes) for every object which class directly or indirectly declares virtual functions.
- Lack of address arithmetic makes creating memory-efficient containers, such as tightly spaced structures and XOR linked lists, currently impossible (the OpenJDK Valhalla project aims to mitigate these issues, though it does not aim to introduce pointer arithmetic; this cannot be done in a garbage collected environment).
- Contrary to malloc and new, the average performance overhead of garbage collection asymptotically nears zero (more accurately, one CPU cycle) as the heap size increases.
- Parts of the Java Class Library must load before program execution (at least the classes used within a program). This leads to a significant memory overhead for small applications.
- Both the Java binary and native recompilations will typically be in memory.
- The virtual machine uses substantial memory.
- In Java, a composite object (class A which uses instances of B and C) is created using references to allocated instances of B and C. In C++ the memory and performance cost of these types of references can be avoided when the instance of B and/or C exists within A.

In most cases a C++ application will consume less memory than an equivalent Java application due to the large overhead of Java's virtual machine, class loading and automatic memory resizing. For programs in which memory is a critical factor for choosing between languages and runtime environments, a cost/benefit analysis is needed.

=== Trigonometric functions ===
Performance of trigonometric functions is bad compared to C, because Java has strict specifications for the results of mathematical operations, which may not correspond to the underlying hardware implementation. On the x87 floating point subset, Java since 1.4 does argument reduction for sin and cos in software, causing a big performance hit for values outside the range.

=== Java Native Interface ===
The Java Native Interface invokes a high overhead, making it costly to cross the boundary between code running on the JVM and native code. Java Native Access (JNA) provides Java programs easy access to native shared libraries (dynamic-link library (DLLs) on Windows) via Java code only, with no JNI or native code. This functionality is comparable to Windows' Platform/Invoke and Python's ctypes. Access is dynamic at runtime without code generation. But it has a cost, and JNA is usually slower than JNI.

=== User interface ===
Swing has been perceived as slower than native widget toolkits, because it delegates the rendering of widgets to the pure Java 2D API. However, benchmarks comparing the performance of Swing versus the Standard Widget Toolkit, which delegates the rendering to the native GUI libraries of the operating system, show no clear winner, and the results greatly depend on the context and the environments. Additionally, the newer JavaFX framework, intended to replace Swing, addresses many of Swing's inherent issues.

=== Use for high performance computing ===
Some people believe that Java performance for high performance computing (HPC) is similar to Fortran on compute-intensive benchmarks, but that JVMs still have scalability issues for performing intensive communication on a grid computing network.

However, high performance computing applications written in Java have won benchmark competitions. In 2008, and 2009, an Apache Hadoop (an open-source high performance computing project written in Java) based cluster was able to sort a terabyte and petabyte of integers the fastest. The hardware setup of the competing systems was not fixed, however.

=== In programming contests ===
Programs in Java start slower than those in other compiled languages. Thus, some online judge systems, notably those hosted by Chinese universities, use longer time limits for Java programs to be fair to contestants using Java.

== See also ==
- Common Language Runtime
- Performance analysis
- Java processor, an embedded processor running Java bytecode natively (such as JStik)
- Comparison of Java and C++
- Java ConcurrentMap
