= Soot (disambiguation) =

Soot is the black, impure carbon particles resulting from the incomplete combustion of a hydrocarbon.

Soot may also refer to:

- Soot (software), a language manipulation and optimization framework
- Soot (surname), list of people with the surname
- Sööt, list of people with the surname
- Soot, the pseudonymous creator of soyjak.party

== See also ==
- Soot blower
- Soot Canal
- Soot tattoo
- Sooty (disambiguation)
