= Garbage (computer science) =

Unused memory in a computer system

In computer science, garbage includes data, objects, or other regions of the memory of a computer system (or other system resources), which will not be used in any future computation by the system, or by a program running on it. Because every computer system has a finite amount of memory, and most software produces garbage, it is frequently necessary to deallocate memory that is occupied by garbage and return it to the heap, or memory pool, for reuse.

== Classification ==
Garbage is generally classified into two types: syntactic garbage, any object or data which is within a program's memory space but unreachable from the program's root set; and semantic garbage, any object or data which is never accessed by a running program for any combination of program inputs. Objects and data which are not garbage are said to be live.

Casually stated, syntactic garbage is data that cannot be reached, and semantic garbage is data that will not be reached. More precisely, syntactic garbage is data that is unreachable due to the reference graph (there is no path to it), which can be determined by many algorithms, as discussed in tracing garbage collection, and only requires analyzing the data, not the code. Semantic garbage is data that will not be accessed, either because it is unreachable (hence also syntactic garbage), or is reachable but will not be accessed; determining the latter requires code analysis, and is in general undecidable.

Syntactic garbage is a (usually strict) subset of semantic garbage, as it is entirely possible for an object to hold a reference to another object without ever using that object.

== Example ==
In the following simple stack implementation in Java, each element popped from the stack becomes semantic garbage once there are no outside references to it: (Note: Simplified from Effective Java Item 6 by omitting resizing and explicit exceptions.)

public class Stack {
    private Object[] elements;
    private int size;

    public Stack(int capacity) {
        elements = new Object[capacity];
    }
    public void push(Object e) {
        elements[size++] = e;
    }
    public Object pop() {
        return elements[--size];
    }
}

This is because elements[] still contains a reference to the object, but the object will never be accessed again through this reference, because elements[] is private to the class and the pop method only returns references to elements it has not already popped. (After it decrements size, this class will never access that element again.) However, knowing this requires analysis of the code of the class, which is undecidable in general.

If a later push call re-grows the stack to the previous size, overwriting this last reference, then the object will become syntactic garbage, because it can never be accessed again, and will be eligible for garbage collection.

=== Automatic garbage collection ===
An example of the automatic collection of syntactic garbage, by reference counting garbage collection, can be produced using the Python command-line interpreter:

>>> class Foo:
...     """This is an empty testing class."""
...     pass
...
>>> bar = Foo()
>>> bar
<__main__.Foo object at 0x54f30>
>>> del bar

In this session, an object is created, its location in the memory is displayed, and the only reference to the object is then destroyed—there is no way to ever use the object again from this point on, as there are no references to it. This becomes apparent when we try to access the original reference:

>>> bar
Traceback (most recent call last):
  File "<stdin>", line 1, in ?
NameError: name 'bar' is not defined

As it is now impossible to refer to the object, the object has become useless; it is garbage. Since Python uses garbage collection, it automatically deallocates the memory that was used for the object so that it may be used again:

>>> class Bar:
...     """This is another testing class."""
...     pass
...
>>> baz = Bar()
>>> baz
<__main__.Bar object at 0x54f30>

The Bar instance now resides at the memory location 0x54f30; at the same place as where our previous object, the Foo instance, was located. Since the Foo instance was destroyed, freeing up the memory used to contain it, the interpreter creates the Bar object at the same memory location as before, making good use of the available resources.

== Effects ==
Garbage consumes heap memory, and thus one wishes to collect it (to minimize memory use, allow faster memory allocation, and prevent out-of-memory errors by reducing heap fragmentation and memory use).

However, collecting garbage takes time and, if done manually, requires coding overhead. Further, collecting garbage destroys objects and thus can cause calls to finalizers, executing potentially arbitrary code at an arbitrary point in the program's execution. Incorrect garbage collection (deallocating memory that is not garbage), primarily due to errors in manual garbage collection (rather than errors in garbage collectors), results in memory safety violations (that often create security holes) due to use of dangling pointers.

Syntactic garbage can be collected automatically, and garbage collectors have been extensively studied and developed. Semantic garbage cannot be automatically collected in general, and thus causes memory leaks even in garbage-collected languages. Detecting and eliminating semantic garbage is typically done using a specialized debugging tool called a heap profiler, which allows one to see which objects are live and how they are reachable, enabling one to remove the unintended reference.

== Eliminating garbage ==
The problem of managing the deallocation of garbage is well-known in computer science. Several approaches are taken:

- Many operating systems reclaim the memory and resources used by a process or program when it terminates. Simple or short-lived programs which are designed to run in such environments can exit and allow the operating system to perform any necessary reclamation.
- In systems or programming languages with manual memory management, the programmer must explicitly arrange for memory to be deallocated when it is no longer used. C and C++ are two well-known languages which support this model.
- Garbage collection uses various algorithms to automatically analyze the state of a program, identify garbage, and deallocate it without intervention by the programmer. Many modern programming languages such as Java and Haskell provide automated garbage collection. However, it is not a recent development, as it has also been used in older languages such as LISP.
- There is ongoing research to type-theoretic approaches (such as region inference) to identification and removal of garbage from a program. No general type-theoretic solution to the problem has been developed.
