= JStik =

The JStik is a microcontroller based on the aJile Systems line of embedded Java processors. It is novel in that it uses Java byte code as the native machine language. This makes it very fast at executing Java code while still maintaining the benefits of programming in a high-level language like Java.
