= Concurrent mark sweep collector =

The concurrent mark sweep collector (concurrent mark-sweep collector, concurrent collector or CMS) was a mark-and-sweep garbage collector in the Oracle HotSpot Java virtual machine (JVM) available since version 1.4.1. It was deprecated on version 9 and removed on version 14, so from Java 14 it is no longer available.

== HotSpot garbage collectors ==
The HotSpot JVM selects the default garbage collector based on several factors. The newer Garbage-First collector (G1) was planned to replace CMS. That change was finally done in version 9.

To launch the JVM with this garbage collector you can add this property to the java command line -XX:+UseConcMarkSweepGC when using Java version less than 14.

== See also ==
- List of Java virtual machines
