= Java Optimized Processor =

Processor which can execute Java bytecode

Java Optimized Processor (JOP) is a Java processor, an implementation of Java virtual machine (JVM) in hardware.

JOP is free hardware under the GNU General Public License, version 3.

The intention of JOP is to provide a small hardware JVM for embedded real-time systems. The main feature is the predictability of the execution time of Java bytecodes. JOP is implemented over an FPGA.

== See also ==
- List of Java virtual machines
- SimpCon
