= PicoJava =

Java processor created by Sun Microsystems

picoJava is a microprocessor specification dedicated to native execution of Java bytecode without the need for an interpreter or just-in-time compilation. The aim is to speed bytecode execution up by up to 20 times, compared to standard Intel CPU with a Java virtual machine. GNU Compiler Collection added picoJava support in 1999 as machine definition 'pj,'. The open-source version of picoJava has been implemented in an FPGA.

== Creation ==
Picojava was developed by Sun Microsystems, the first version of the specification was created in 1997. This first version was never released as a product by Sun. A redesign of Picojava in 1999 would give birth to Picojava-II, which is freely available and has a rich documentation.

== See also ==
- Jazelle
- MAJC
