= Sooty (disambiguation) =

Sooty is a British children's television franchise, set around a puppet character of the same name.

Sooty may also refer to:

- Sooty (2001 TV series), a 2001–2004 British children's series, created for the Sooty franchise.
- Sooty (2011 TV series), a 2011 British children's series, created for the Sooty franchise.
- Sooty (gene), trait characterized by black or darker hairs mixed into a horse's coat
- Sooty Jones (20th century), bass guitarist

== See also ==
- Soot (disambiguation)
