= List of JVM bytecode instructions =

This is a list of the instructions that make up JVM bytecode, the abstract machine language that is executed by the Java virtual machine. JVM bytecode is emitted by compilers made for languages running on the Java Platform, most notably Java.

JVM bytecode makes up the instruction contents of methods. When executed, each method is allocated its own frame with a stack, local variable registers, and other data. Most instructions operate on one or more stack values and place their output onto the stack.

Note that any referenced "value" refers to a 32-bit int as per the Java instruction set.

Mnemonic	Opcode (in hex)	Opcode (in binary)	Other bytes [count]: [operand labels]	Stack [before]→[after]	Description
aaload	32	0011 0010		arrayref, index → value	load onto the stack a reference from an array
aastore	53	0101 0011		arrayref, index, value →	store a reference in an array
aconst_null	01	0000 0001		→ null	push a null reference onto the stack
aload	19	0001 1001	1: index	→ objectref	load a reference onto the stack from a local variable #index
aload_0	2a	0010 1010		→ objectref	load a reference onto the stack from local variable 0
aload_1	2b	0010 1011		→ objectref	load a reference onto the stack from local variable 1
aload_2	2c	0010 1100		→ objectref	load a reference onto the stack from local variable 2
aload_3	2d	0010 1101		→ objectref	load a reference onto the stack from local variable 3
anewarray	bd	1011 1101	2: indexbyte1, indexbyte2	count → arrayref	create a new array of references of length count and component type identified by the class reference index (indexbyte1 << 8 | indexbyte2) in the constant pool
areturn	b0	1011 0000		objectref → [empty]	return a reference from a method
arraylength	be	1011 1110		arrayref → length	get the length of an array
astore	3a	0011 1010	1: index	objectref →	store a reference into a local variable #index
astore_0	4b	0100 1011		objectref →	store a reference into local variable 0
astore_1	4c	0100 1100		objectref →	store a reference into local variable 1
astore_2	4d	0100 1101		objectref →	store a reference into local variable 2
astore_3	4e	0100 1110		objectref →	store a reference into local variable 3
athrow	bf	1011 1111		objectref → [empty], objectref	throws an error or exception (notice that the rest of the stack is cleared, leaving only a reference to the Throwable)
baload	33	0011 0011		arrayref, index → value	load a byte or Boolean value from an array
bastore	54	0101 0100		arrayref, index, value →	store a byte or Boolean value into an array
bipush	10	0001 0000	1: byte	→ value	push a byte onto the stack as an integer value
breakpoint	ca	1100 1010			reserved for breakpoints in Java debuggers; should not appear in any class file
caload	34	0011 0100		arrayref, index → value	load a char from an array
castore	55	0101 0101		arrayref, index, value →	store a char into an array
checkcast	c0	1100 0000	2: indexbyte1, indexbyte2	objectref → objectref	checks whether an objectref is of a certain type, the class reference of which is in the constant pool at index (indexbyte1 << 8 | indexbyte2)
d2f	90	1001 0000		value → result	convert a double to a float
d2i	8e	1000 1110		value → result	convert a double to an int
d2l	8f	1000 1111		value → result	convert a double to a long
dadd	63	0110 0011		value1, value2 → result	add two doubles
daload	31	0011 0001		arrayref, index → value	load a double from an array
dastore	52	0101 0010		arrayref, index, value →	store a double into an array
dcmpg	98	1001 1000		value1, value2 → result	compare two doubles, 1 on NaN
dcmpl	97	1001 0111		value1, value2 → result	compare two doubles, -1 on NaN
dconst_0	0e	0000 1110		→ 0.0	push the constant 0.0 (a double) onto the stack
dconst_1	0f	0000 1111		→ 1.0	push the constant 1.0 (a double) onto the stack
ddiv	6f	0110 1111		value1, value2 → result	divide two doubles
dload	18	0001 1000	1: index	→ value	load a double value from a local variable #index
dload_0	26	0010 0110		→ value	load a double from local variable 0
dload_1	27	0010 0111		→ value	load a double from local variable 1
dload_2	28	0010 1000		→ value	load a double from local variable 2
dload_3	29	0010 1001		→ value	load a double from local variable 3
dmul	6b	0110 1011		value1, value2 → result	multiply two doubles
dneg	77	0111 0111		value → result	negate a double
drem	73	0111 0011		value1, value2 → result	get the remainder from a division between two doubles
dreturn	af	1010 1111		value → [empty]	return a double from a method
dstore	39	0011 1001	1: index	value →	store a double value into a local variable #index
dstore_0	47	0100 0111		value →	store a double into local variable 0
dstore_1	48	0100 1000		value →	store a double into local variable 1
dstore_2	49	0100 1001		value →	store a double into local variable 2
dstore_3	4a	0100 1010		value →	store a double into local variable 3
dsub	67	0110 0111		value1, value2 → result	subtract a double from another
dup	59	0101 1001		value → value, value	duplicate the value on top of the stack
dup_x1	5a	0101 1010		value2, value1 → value1, value2, value1	insert a copy of the top value into the stack two values from the top. value1 and value2 must not be of the type double or long.
dup_x2	5b	0101 1011		value3, value2, value1 → value1, value3, value2, value1	insert a copy of the top value into the stack two (if value2 is double or long it takes up the entry of value3, too) or three values (if value2 is neither double nor long) from the top
dup2	5c	0101 1100		{value2, value1} → {value2, value1}, {value2, value1}	duplicate top two stack words (two values, if value1 is not double nor long; a single value, if value1 is double or long)
dup2_x1	5d	0101 1101		value3, {value2, value1} → {value2, value1}, value3, {value2, value1}	duplicate two words and insert beneath third word (see explanation above)
dup2_x2	5e	0101 1110		{value4, value3}, {value2, value1} → {value2, value1}, {value4, value3}, {value2, value1}	duplicate two words and insert beneath fourth word
f2d	8d	1000 1101		value → result	convert a float to a double
f2i	8b	1000 1011		value → result	convert a float to an int
f2l	8c	1000 1100		value → result	convert a float to a long
fadd	62	0110 0010		value1, value2 → result	add two floats
faload	30	0011 0000		arrayref, index → value	load a float from an array
fastore	51	0101 0001		arrayref, index, value →	store a float in an array
fcmpg	96	1001 0110		value1, value2 → result	compare two floats, 1 on NaN
fcmpl	95	1001 0101		value1, value2 → result	compare two floats, -1 on NaN
fconst_0	0b	0000 1011		→ 0.0f	push 0.0f on the stack
fconst_1	0c	0000 1100		→ 1.0f	push 1.0f on the stack
fconst_2	0d	0000 1101		→ 2.0f	push 2.0f on the stack
fdiv	6e	0110 1110		value1, value2 → result	divide two floats
fload	17	0001 0111	1: index	→ value	load a float value from a local variable #index
fload_0	22	0010 0010		→ value	load a float value from local variable 0
fload_1	23	0010 0011		→ value	load a float value from local variable 1
fload_2	24	0010 0100		→ value	load a float value from local variable 2
fload_3	25	0010 0101		→ value	load a float value from local variable 3
fmul	6a	0110 1010		value1, value2 → result	multiply two floats
fneg	76	0111 0110		value → result	negate a float
frem	72	0111 0010		value1, value2 → result	get the remainder from a division between two floats
freturn	ae	1010 1110		value → [empty]	return a float
fstore	38	0011 1000	1: index	value →	store a float value into a local variable #index
fstore_0	43	0100 0011		value →	store a float value into local variable 0
fstore_1	44	0100 0100		value →	store a float value into local variable 1
fstore_2	45	0100 0101		value →	store a float value into local variable 2
fstore_3	46	0100 0110		value →	store a float value into local variable 3
fsub	66	0110 0110		value1, value2 → result	subtract two floats
getfield	b4	1011 0100	2: indexbyte1, indexbyte2	objectref → value	get a field value of an object objectref, where the field is identified by field reference in the constant pool index (indexbyte1 << 8 | indexbyte2)
getstatic	b2	1011 0010	2: indexbyte1, indexbyte2	→ value	get a static field value of a class, where the field is identified by field reference in the constant pool index (indexbyte1 << 8 | indexbyte2)
goto	a7	1010 0111	2: branchbyte1, branchbyte2	[no change]	goes to another instruction at branchoffset (signed short constructed from unsigned bytes branchbyte1 << 8 | branchbyte2)
goto_w	c8	1100 1000	4: branchbyte1, branchbyte2, branchbyte3, branchbyte4	[no change]	goes to another instruction at branchoffset (signed int constructed from unsigned bytes branchbyte1 << 24 | branchbyte2 << 16 | branchbyte3 << 8 | branchbyte4)
i2b	91	1001 0001		value → result	convert an int into a byte
i2c	92	1001 0010		value → result	convert an int into a character
i2d	87	1000 0111		value → result	convert an int into a double
i2f	86	1000 0110		value → result	convert an int into a float
i2l	85	1000 0101		value → result	convert an int into a long
i2s	93	1001 0011		value → result	convert an int into a short
iadd	60	0110 0000		value1, value2 → result	add two ints
iaload	2e	0010 1110		arrayref, index → value	load an int from an array
iand	7e	0111 1110		value1, value2 → result	perform a bitwise AND on two integers
iastore	4f	0100 1111		arrayref, index, value →	store an int into an array
iconst_m1	02	0000 0010		→ -1	load the int value −1 onto the stack
iconst_0	03	0000 0011		→ 0	load the int value 0 onto the stack
iconst_1	04	0000 0100		→ 1	load the int value 1 onto the stack
iconst_2	05	0000 0101		→ 2	load the int value 2 onto the stack
iconst_3	06	0000 0110		→ 3	load the int value 3 onto the stack
iconst_4	07	0000 0111		→ 4	load the int value 4 onto the stack
iconst_5	08	0000 1000		→ 5	load the int value 5 onto the stack
idiv	6c	0110 1100		value1, value2 → result	divide two integers
if_acmpeq	a5	1010 0101	2: branchbyte1, branchbyte2	value1, value2 →	if references are equal, branch to instruction at branchoffset (signed short constructed from unsigned bytes branchbyte1 << 8 | branchbyte2)
if_acmpne	a6	1010 0110	2: branchbyte1, branchbyte2	value1, value2 →	if references are not equal, branch to instruction at branchoffset (signed short constructed from unsigned bytes branchbyte1 << 8 | branchbyte2)
if_icmpeq	9f	1001 1111	2: branchbyte1, branchbyte2	value1, value2 →	if ints are equal, branch to instruction at branchoffset (signed short constructed from unsigned bytes branchbyte1 << 8 | branchbyte2)
if_icmpge	a2	1010 0010	2: branchbyte1, branchbyte2	value1, value2 →	if value1 is greater than or equal to value2, branch to instruction at branchoffset (signed short constructed from unsigned bytes branchbyte1 << 8 | branchbyte2)
if_icmpgt	a3	1010 0011	2: branchbyte1, branchbyte2	value1, value2 →	if value1 is greater than value2, branch to instruction at branchoffset (signed short constructed from unsigned bytes branchbyte1 << 8 | branchbyte2)
if_icmple	a4	1010 0100	2: branchbyte1, branchbyte2	value1, value2 →	if value1 is less than or equal to value2, branch to instruction at branchoffset (signed short constructed from unsigned bytes branchbyte1 << 8 | branchbyte2)
if_icmplt	a1	1010 0001	2: branchbyte1, branchbyte2	value1, value2 →	if value1 is less than value2, branch to instruction at branchoffset (signed short constructed from unsigned bytes branchbyte1 << 8 | branchbyte2)
if_icmpne	a0	1010 0000	2: branchbyte1, branchbyte2	value1, value2 →	if ints are not equal, branch to instruction at branchoffset (signed short constructed from unsigned bytes branchbyte1 << 8 | branchbyte2)
ifeq	99	1001 1001	2: branchbyte1, branchbyte2	value →	if value is 0, branch to instruction at branchoffset (signed short constructed from unsigned bytes branchbyte1 << 8 | branchbyte2)
ifge	9c	1001 1100	2: branchbyte1, branchbyte2	value →	if value is greater than or equal to 0, branch to instruction at branchoffset (signed short constructed from unsigned bytes branchbyte1 << 8 | branchbyte2)
ifgt	9d	1001 1101	2: branchbyte1, branchbyte2	value →	if value is greater than 0, branch to instruction at branchoffset (signed short constructed from unsigned bytes branchbyte1 << 8 | branchbyte2)
ifle	9e	1001 1110	2: branchbyte1, branchbyte2	value →	if value is less than or equal to 0, branch to instruction at branchoffset (signed short constructed from unsigned bytes branchbyte1 << 8 | branchbyte2)
iflt	9b	1001 1011	2: branchbyte1, branchbyte2	value →	if value is less than 0, branch to instruction at branchoffset (signed short constructed from unsigned bytes branchbyte1 << 8 | branchbyte2)
ifne	9a	1001 1010	2: branchbyte1, branchbyte2	value →	if value is not 0, branch to instruction at branchoffset (signed short constructed from unsigned bytes branchbyte1 << 8 | branchbyte2)
ifnonnull	c7	1100 0111	2: branchbyte1, branchbyte2	value →	if value is not null, branch to instruction at branchoffset (signed short constructed from unsigned bytes branchbyte1 << 8 | branchbyte2)
ifnull	c6	1100 0110	2: branchbyte1, branchbyte2	value →	if value is null, branch to instruction at branchoffset (signed short constructed from unsigned bytes branchbyte1 << 8 | branchbyte2)
iinc	84	1000 0100	2: index, const	[No change]	increment local variable #index by signed byte const
iload	15	0001 0101	1: index	→ value	load an int value from a local variable #index
iload_0	1a	0001 1010		→ value	load an int value from local variable 0
iload_1	1b	0001 1011		→ value	load an int value from local variable 1
iload_2	1c	0001 1100		→ value	load an int value from local variable 2
iload_3	1d	0001 1101		→ value	load an int value from local variable 3
impdep1	fe	1111 1110			reserved for implementation-dependent operations within debuggers; should not appear in any class file
impdep2	ff	1111 1111			reserved for implementation-dependent operations within debuggers; should not appear in any class file
imul	68	0110 1000		value1, value2 → result	multiply two integers
ineg	74	0111 0100		value → result	negate int
instanceof	c1	1100 0001	2: indexbyte1, indexbyte2	objectref → result	determines if an object objectref is of a given type, identified by class reference index in constant pool (indexbyte1 << 8 | indexbyte2)
invokedynamic	ba	1011 1010	4: indexbyte1, indexbyte2, 0, 0	[arg1, arg2, ...] → result	invokes a dynamic method and puts the result on the stack (might be void); the method is identified by method reference index in constant pool (indexbyte1 << 8 | indexbyte2)
invokeinterface	b9	1011 1001	4: indexbyte1, indexbyte2, count, 0	objectref, [arg1, arg2, ...] → result	invokes an interface method on object objectref and puts the result on the stack (might be void); the interface method is identified by method reference index in constant pool (indexbyte1 << 8 | indexbyte2)
invokespecial	b7	1011 0111	2: indexbyte1, indexbyte2	objectref, [arg1, arg2, ...] → result	invoke instance method on object objectref and puts the result on the stack (might be void); the method is identified by method reference index in constant pool (indexbyte1 << 8 | indexbyte2)
invokestatic	b8	1011 1000	2: indexbyte1, indexbyte2	[arg1, arg2, ...] → result	invoke a static method and puts the result on the stack (might be void); the method is identified by method reference index in constant pool (indexbyte1 << 8 | indexbyte2)
invokevirtual	b6	1011 0110	2: indexbyte1, indexbyte2	objectref, [arg1, arg2, ...] → result	invoke virtual method on object objectref and puts the result on the stack (might be void); the method is identified by method reference index in constant pool (indexbyte1 << 8 | indexbyte2)
ior	80	1000 0000		value1, value2 → result	bitwise int OR
irem	70	0111 0000		value1, value2 → result	logical int remainder
ireturn	ac	1010 1100		value → [empty]	return an integer from a method
ishl	78	0111 1000		value1, value2 → result	int shift left
ishr	7a	0111 1010		value1, value2 → result	int arithmetic shift right
istore	36	0011 0110	1: index	value →	store int value into variable #index
istore_0	3b	0011 1011		value →	store int value into variable 0
istore_1	3c	0011 1100		value →	store int value into variable 1
istore_2	3d	0011 1101		value →	store int value into variable 2
istore_3	3e	0011 1110		value →	store int value into variable 3
isub	64	0110 0100		value1, value2 → result	int subtract
iushr	7c	0111 1100		value1, value2 → result	int logical shift right
ixor	82	1000 0010		value1, value2 → result	int xor
jsr^{†}	a8	1010 1000	2: branchbyte1, branchbyte2	→ address	jump to subroutine at branchoffset (signed short constructed from unsigned bytes branchbyte1 << 8 | branchbyte2) and place the return address on the stack
jsr_w^{†}	c9	1100 1001	4: branchbyte1, branchbyte2, branchbyte3, branchbyte4	→ address	jump to subroutine at branchoffset (signed int constructed from unsigned bytes branchbyte1 << 24 | branchbyte2 << 16 | branchbyte3 << 8 | branchbyte4) and place the return address on the stack
l2d	8a	1000 1010		value → result	convert a long to a double
l2f	89	1000 1001		value → result	convert a long to a float
l2i	88	1000 1000		value → result	convert a long to a int
ladd	61	0110 0001		value1, value2 → result	add two longs
laload	2f	0010 1111		arrayref, index → value	load a long from an array
land	7f	0111 1111		value1, value2 → result	bitwise AND of two longs
lastore	50	0101 0000		arrayref, index, value →	store a long to an array
lcmp	94	1001 0100		value1, value2 → result	push 0 if the two longs are the same, 1 if value1 is greater than value2, -1 otherwise
lconst_0	09	0000 1001		→ 0L	push 0L (the number zero with type long) onto the stack
lconst_1	0a	0000 1010		→ 1L	push 1L (the number one with type long) onto the stack
ldc	12	0001 0010	1: index	→ value	push a constant #index from a constant pool (String, int, float, Class, java.lang.invoke.MethodType, java.lang.invoke.MethodHandle, or a dynamically-computed constant) onto the stack
ldc_w	13	0001 0011	2: indexbyte1, indexbyte2	→ value	push a constant #index from a constant pool (String, int, float, Class, java.lang.invoke.MethodType, java.lang.invoke.MethodHandle, or a dynamically-computed constant) onto the stack (wide index is constructed as indexbyte1 << 8 | indexbyte2)
ldc2_w	14	0001 0100	2: indexbyte1, indexbyte2	→ value	push a constant #index from a constant pool (double, long, or a dynamically-computed constant) onto the stack (wide index is constructed as indexbyte1 << 8 | indexbyte2)
ldiv	6d	0110 1101		value1, value2 → result	divide two longs
lload	16	0001 0110	1: index	→ value	load a long value from a local variable #index
lload_0	1e	0001 1110		→ value	load a long value from a local variable 0
lload_1	1f	0001 1111		→ value	load a long value from a local variable 1
lload_2	20	0010 0000		→ value	load a long value from a local variable 2
lload_3	21	0010 0001		→ value	load a long value from a local variable 3
lmul	69	0110 1001		value1, value2 → result	multiply two longs
lneg	75	0111 0101		value → result	negate a long
lookupswitch	ab	1010 1011	8+: <0–3 bytes padding>, defaultbyte1, defaultbyte2, defaultbyte3, defaultbyte4, npairs1, npairs2, npairs3, npairs4, match-offset pairs...	key →	a target address is looked up from a table using a key and execution continues from the instruction at that address
lor	81	1000 0001		value1, value2 → result	bitwise OR of two longs
lrem	71	0111 0001		value1, value2 → result	remainder of division of two longs
lreturn	ad	1010 1101		value → [empty]	return a long value
lshl	79	0111 1001		value1, value2 → result	bitwise shift left of a long value1 by int value2 positions
lshr	7b	0111 1011		value1, value2 → result	bitwise shift right of a long value1 by int value2 positions
lstore	37	0011 0111	1: index	value →	store a long value in a local variable #index
lstore_0	3f	0011 1111		value →	store a long value in a local variable 0
lstore_1	40	0100 0000		value →	store a long value in a local variable 1
lstore_2	41	0100 0001		value →	store a long value in a local variable 2
lstore_3	42	0100 0010		value →	store a long value in a local variable 3
lsub	65	0110 0101		value1, value2 → result	subtract two longs
lushr	7d	0111 1101		value1, value2 → result	bitwise shift right of a long value1 by int value2 positions, unsigned
lxor	83	1000 0011		value1, value2 → result	bitwise XOR of two longs
monitorenter	c2	1100 0010		objectref →	enter monitor for object ("grab the lock" – start of synchronized() section)
monitorexit	c3	1100 0011		objectref →	exit monitor for object ("release the lock" – end of synchronized() section)
multianewarray	c5	1100 0101	3: indexbyte1, indexbyte2, dimensions	count1, [count2,...] → arrayref	create a new array of dimensions dimensions of type identified by class reference in constant pool index (indexbyte1 << 8 | indexbyte2); the sizes of each dimension is identified by count1, [count2, etc.]
new	bb	1011 1011	2: indexbyte1, indexbyte2	→ objectref	create new object of type identified by class reference in constant pool index (indexbyte1 << 8 | indexbyte2)
newarray	bc	1011 1100	1: atype	count → arrayref	create new array with count elements of primitive type identified by atype
nop	00	0000 0000		[No change]	perform no operation
pop	57	0101 0111		value →	discard the top value on the stack
pop2	58	0101 1000		{value2, value1} →	discard the top two values on the stack (or one value, if it is a double or long)
putfield	b5	1011 0101	2: indexbyte1, indexbyte2	objectref, value →	set field to value in an object objectref, where the field is identified by a field reference index in constant pool (indexbyte1 << 8 | indexbyte2)
putstatic	b3	1011 0011	2: indexbyte1, indexbyte2	value →	set static field to value in a class, where the field is identified by a field reference index in constant pool (indexbyte1 << 8 | indexbyte2)
ret^{†}	a9	1010 1001	1: index	[No change]	continue execution from address taken from a local variable #index (the asymmetry with jsr is intentional)
return	b1	1011 0001		→ [empty]	return from a void method
saload	35	0011 0101		arrayref, index → value	load short from array
sastore	56	0101 0110		arrayref, index, value →	store short to array
sipush	11	0001 0001	2: byte1, byte2	→ value	push a short onto the stack as an integer value
swap	5f	0101 1111		value2, value1 → value1, value2	swaps two top words on the stack (note that value1 and value2 must not be double or long)
tableswitch	aa	1010 1010	16+: [0–3 bytes padding], defaultbyte1, defaultbyte2, defaultbyte3, defaultbyte4, lowbyte1, lowbyte2, lowbyte3, lowbyte4, highbyte1, highbyte2, highbyte3, highbyte4, jump offsets...	index →	continue execution from an address in the table at offset index
wide	c4	1100 0100	3/5: opcode, indexbyte1, indexbyte2 or iinc, indexbyte1, indexbyte2, countbyte1, countbyte2	[same as for corresponding instructions]	execute opcode, where opcode is either iload, fload, aload, lload, dload, istore, fstore, astore, lstore, dstore, or ret, but assume the index is 16 bit; or execute iinc, where the index is 16 bits and the constant to increment by is a signed 16 bit short
(no name)	cb-fd				these values are currently unassigned for opcodes and are reserved for future use

^{†}Deprecated in Java 7 (major class version 51). They will not appear in class files generated from a compiler newer than that.

== See also ==
- Jazelle DBX (Direct Bytecode eXecution), a feature that executes some Java bytecodes in hardware, on some ARM9 CPUs
- Common Intermediate Language (CIL), a similar bytecode specification that runs on the CLR of the .NET Framework
