= Java Heterogeneous Distributed Computing =

Java Heterogeneous Distributed Computing is a programmable Java distributed system which was developed at the National University of Ireland in Maynooth. It allows researchers to access the spare clock cycles of a large number of semi-idle desktop PCs. It also allows for multiple problems to be processed in parallel with sophisticated scheduling mechanisms controlling the system. It has been successful when used for tackling problems in the areas of Bioinformatics, Biomedical engineering and cryptography.

It is an open source project licensed under the GPL.

== See also ==
- List of volunteer computing projects
- Distributed computing
- Java
