= Sööt =

Family name

Origin
- Language: Estonian
- Meaning: "fodder" and "fallow field"
- Region of origin: Estonia

Sööt is an Estonian language surname with the dual meaning of "fodder" and "fallow field". As of 1 January 2023, 208 men and 234 women bear the surname Sööt in Estonia. Sööt ranks 274th for men and 266th for women in terms of prevalence of surnames in the country. Sööt is most commonly found in Tartu County, where 9.06 per 10,000 inhabitants bear the name.

People bearing the surname Sööt inclute:

- Andres Sööt (born 1934), Estonian film director and cinematographer
- Ants Sööt (1935–2013), Estonian choir director and music pedagogue
- Karl Eduard Sööt (1862–1950), Estonian poet
- Meeli Sööt (born 1937), Estonian actress
