= Soot (surname) =

Soot is a surname. Notable people with the surname are as follows:

- Botten Soot (1895–1958), Norwegian actress, singer, and dancer
- Engebret Soot (1786-1859), Norwegian engineer
- Eyolf Soot (1859–1928), Norwegian painter
- Fritz Soot (1878–1965), German opera singer
- Jaan Soots (1880–1942), Estonian military officer and politician
- Wilbur Soot (born 1996), a British internet personality, Twitch streamer and singer-songwriter
