= Java virtual machine =

Virtual machine that runs Java programs

- Designer: Sun Microsystems
- Bits: 32-bit, 64-bit (Note: 32-bit x86 support was removed starting with JDK 21 (Windows) and JDK 25 (Linux).)
- Introduced: 1994; 32 years ago
- Version: Java SE 26
- Type: Stack and register–register
- Encoding: Variable
- Branching: Compare and branch
- Endianness: Big
- Open: Yes

Registers
- General-purpose: Per-method operand stack (up to 65535 operands) plus per-method local variables (up to 65535)

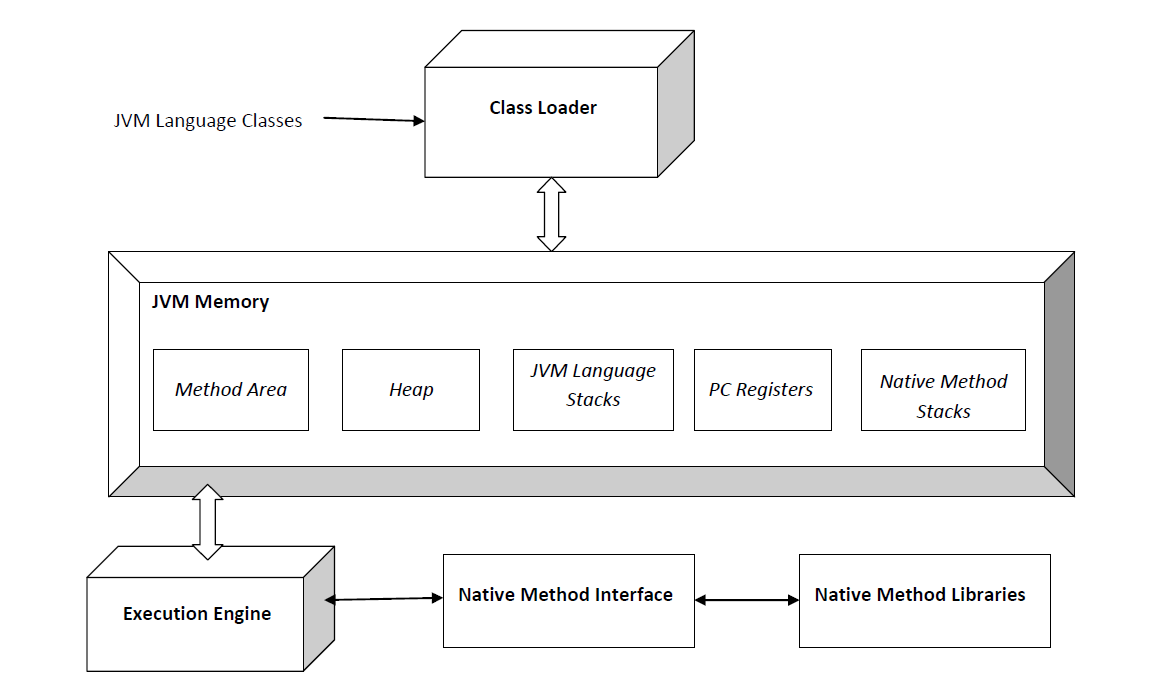
Overview of a Java virtual machine (JVM) architecture based on The Java Virtual Machine Specification Java SE 7 Edition

A Java virtual machine (JVM) is a virtual machine that enables a computer to run Java programs as well as programs written in other languages, referred to as JVM languages, that are also compiled to Java bytecode. The JVM is detailed by a specification that formally describes what is required in a JVM implementation. Having a specification ensures interoperability of Java programs across different implementations so that program authors using the Java Development Kit (JDK) need not worry about idiosyncrasies of the underlying hardware platform.

The JVM reference implementation is developed by the OpenJDK project as open source code and includes a JIT compiler called HotSpot. The commercially supported Java releases available from Oracle are based on the OpenJDK runtime. Eclipse OpenJ9 is another open source JVM for OpenJDK.

== JVM specification ==
The Java virtual machine is an abstract (virtual) computer defined by a specification. It is a part of the Java Runtime Environment. The garbage collection algorithm used and any internal optimization of the Java virtual machine instructions (their translation into machine code) are not specified. The main reason for this omission is to not unnecessarily constrain implementers. Any Java application can be run only inside some concrete implementation of the abstract specification of the Java virtual machine.

Starting with Java Platform, Standard Edition (J2SE) 5.0, changes to the JVM specification have been developed under the Java Community Process as JSR 924. As of 2006, changes to the specification to support changes proposed to the class file format (JSR 202) are being done as a maintenance release of JSR 924. The specification for the JVM was published as the blue book, whose preface states:

We intend that this specification should sufficiently document the Java Virtual Machine to make possible compatible clean-room implementations. Oracle provides tests that verify the proper operation of implementations of the Java Virtual Machine.

The most commonly used Java virtual machine is Oracle's HotSpot.

Oracle owns the Java trademark and may allow its use to certify implementation suites as fully compatible with Oracle's specification.

=== Garbage collectors ===
Garbage collectors available in Java OpenJDKs virtual machine (JVM) include:

- Serial
- Parallel
- CMS (Concurrent Mark Sweep)
- G1 (Garbage-First)
- ZGC (Z Garbage Collector)
- Epsilon
- Shenandoah
- GenZGC (Generational ZGC)
- GenShen (Generational Shenandoah)
- IBM Metronome (only in IBM OpenJDK)
- SAP (only in SAP OpenJDK)
- Azul C4 (Continuously Concurrent Compacting Collector) (only in Azul Systems OpenJDK)

Java versions and their Garbage Collectors
Version	Default GC	Available GCs
6u14	Serial / Parallel (MP)	Serial, Parallel, CMS, G1 (E)
7u4–8	Serial / Parallel (MP)	Serial, Parallel, CMS, G1
9–10	Serial / G1	Serial, Parallel, CMS, G1
11	Serial / G1	Serial, Parallel, CMS, G1, Epsilon (E), ZGC (E)
12–13	Serial / G1	Serial, Parallel, CMS, G1, Epsilon (E), ZGC (E), Shenandoah (E)
14	Serial / G1	Serial, Parallel, G1, Epsilon (E), ZGC (E), Shenandoah (E)
15–20	Serial / G1	Serial, Parallel, G1, Epsilon (E), ZGC, Shenandoah
21–22	Serial / G1	Serial, Parallel, G1, Epsilon (E), ZGC, Shenandoah, GenZGC (E)
23	Serial / G1	Serial, Parallel, G1, Epsilon (E), ZGC, Shenandoah, GenZGC (default ZGC)
24	Serial / G1	Serial, Parallel, G1, Epsilon (E), Shenandoah, GenZGC, GenShen (E)
25-26	Serial / G1	Serial, Parallel, G1, Epsilon (E), Shenandoah, GenZGC, GenShen
27	G1	Serial, Parallel, G1, Epsilon (E), Shenandoah, GenZGC, GenShen
28	G1	Serial, Parallel, G1, Epsilon (E), Shenandoah, GenZGC, GenShen (default Shenandoah)
(E) = experimental

Java's design philosophy revolves around the assumption of a garbage collector. Unlike languages such as C++ and Rust, deterministic memory management through a delete keyword (as in C++) is not possible. Even introducing such a feature is not possible, due to a lack of ownership semantics. In fact, the sun.misc.Unsafe and java.lang.foreign (see Foreign Function and Memory API) allocate/deallocate memory outside the Java heap. Due to Java primarily using heap-based allocation, objects are stored as references, and deletion would result in dangling pointers.

Foo a = new Foo();
Foo b = a;

delete a;
System.out.println(b); // unclear, is b also deleted?

== Virtual machine architecture ==
The JVM operates on specific types of data as specified in Java Virtual Machine specifications. The data types can be divided into primitive types (integer and floating-point values) and reference types. long and double types, which are 64-bits, are supported natively, but consume two units of storage in a frame's local variables or operand stack, since each unit is 32 bits. boolean, byte, short, and char types are all sign-extended (except char which is zero-extended) and operated on as 32-bit integers, the same as int types. The smaller types only have a few type-specific instructions for loading, storing, and type conversion. boolean is operated on as 8-bit byte values, with 0 representing false and 1 representing true. (Although boolean has been treated as a type since The Java Virtual Machine Specification, Second Edition clarified this issue, in compiled and executed code there is little difference between a boolean and a byte except for name mangling in method signatures and the type of Boolean arrays. booleans in method signatures are mangled as Z while bytes are mangled as B. Boolean arrays carry the type boolean[] but use 8 bits per element, and the JVM has no built-in capability to pack booleans into a bit array, so except for the type they perform and behave the same as byte arrays. In all other uses, the boolean type is effectively unknown to the JVM as all instructions to operate on booleans are also used to operate on bytes.)

The JVM has a garbage-collected heap for storing objects and arrays. Code, constants, and other class data are stored in the "method area". The method area is logically part of the heap, but implementations may treat the method area separately from the heap, and for example might not garbage collect it. Each JVM thread also has its own call stack (called a "Java Virtual Machine stack" for clarity), which stores frames. A new frame is created each time a method is called, and the frame is destroyed when that method exits.

Each frame provides an "operand stack" and an array of "local variables". The operand stack is used for operands to run computations and for receiving the return value of a called method, while local variables serve the same purpose as registers and are also used to pass method arguments. Thus, the JVM is both a stack machine and a register machine. In practice, HotSpot eliminates every stack besides the native thread/call stack even when running in Interpreted mode, as its Templating Interpreter technically functions as a compiler.

The JVM uses references and stack/array indexes to address data; it does not use byte addressing like most physical machines do, so it does not neatly fit the usual categorization of 32-bit or 64-bit machines. In one sense, it could be classified as a 32-bit machine, since this is the size of the largest value it natively stores: a 32-bit integer or floating-point value or a 32-bit reference. Because a reference is 32 bits, each program is limited to at most $2^{32}$ unique references and therefore at most $2^{32}$ objects. However, each object can be more than one byte large, and potentially very large; the largest possible object is an array of long of length $2^{31} - 1$ which would consume 16 GiB of memory, and there could potentially be $2^{32}$ of these if there were enough memory available. This results in upper bounds that are more comparable to a typical 64-bit byte-addressable machine. A JVM implementation can be designed to run on a processor that natively uses any bit width as long as it correctly implements the integer (8-, 16-, 32-, and 64-bit) and floating-point (32- and 64-bit) math that the JVM requires. Depending on the method used to implement references (native pointers, compressed pointers, or an indirection table), this can limit the number of objects to less than the theoretical maximum. An implementation of the JVM on a 64-bit platform has access to a much larger address space than one on a 32-bit platform, which allows for a much larger heap size and an increased maximum number of threads, which is needed for certain kinds of large applications; however, there can be a performance hit from using a 64-bit implementation compared to a 32-bit implementation.

=== JVM languages ===
A JVM language is any language with functions that can be expressed in a valid class file, which can be hosted by a JVM. A class file contains JVM instructions (JVM bytecode), a symbol table, and other ancillary information. The class file format is the hardware- and operating system-independent binary format used to represent compiled classes and interfaces.

There are several JVM languages, both older established languages ported to JVM, and much newer from-scratch languages. JRuby and Jython may be the best known ports of older languages, i.e., Ruby and Python respectively. Of the new from-scratch languages created to compile to Java bytecode, Clojure, Groovy, Scala and Kotlin may be the most popular. A notable feature of the JVM languages is their language interoperability, they are compatible with each other, so that, for example, Scala libraries can be used with Java programs and vice versa.

Java 7 JVM implements JSR 292: Supporting Dynamically Typed Languages on the Java Platform, a new feature which supports dynamically typed languages in the JVM. This feature is developed within the Da Vinci Machine project whose mission is to extend the JVM so that it supports languages other than Java.

=== Class loader ===
One of the organizational units of JVM byte code is a class. A class loader implementation must be able to recognize and load anything that conforms to the Java class file format; the class file has extension .class and contains the bytecode of a single Java class. Any implementation is free to recognize other binary forms besides class files, but it must recognize class files.

The class loader performs three basic activities in this strict order:

1. Loading: finds and imports the binary data for a type
2. Linking: performs verification, preparation, and (optionally) resolution
  - Verification: ensures the correctness of the imported type
  - Preparation: allocates memory for class variables and initializing the memory to default values
  - Resolution: transforms symbolic references from the type into direct references.
3. Initialization: invokes Java code that initializes class variables to their proper starting values.

In general, there are three types of class loader: bootstrap class loader, extension class loader and System / Application class loader.

Every Java virtual machine implementation must have a bootstrap class loader that is capable of loading trusted classes, as well as an extension class loader or application class loader. The Java virtual machine specification does not specify how a class loader should locate classes.

=== Bytecode instructions ===
The JVM has instructions for the following groups of tasks:

- Load and store
- Arithmetic
- Type conversion
- Object creation and manipulation
- Operand stack management (push / pop)
- Control transfer (branching)
- Method invocation and return
- Throwing exceptions
- Monitor-based concurrency

The aim is binary compatibility. Each particular host operating system needs its own implementation of the JVM and runtime. These JVMs interpret the bytecode semantically the same way, but the actual implementation may be different. More complex than just emulating bytecode is compatibly and efficiently implementing the Java core API that must be mapped to each host operating system.

These instructions operate on a set of common abstracted data types rather the native data types of any specific instruction set architecture.

=== Bytecode verifier ===
A basic philosophy of Java is that it is inherently safe from the standpoint that no user program can crash the host machine or otherwise interfere inappropriately with other operations on the host machine, and that it is possible to protect certain methods and data structures belonging to trusted code from access or corruption by untrusted code executing within the same JVM. Furthermore, common programmer errors that often led to data corruption or unpredictable behavior such as accessing off the end of an array or using an uninitialized pointer are not allowed to occur. Several features of Java combine to provide this safety, including the class model, the garbage-collected heap, and the verifier.

The JVM verifies all bytecode before it is executed. This verification consists primarily of three types of checks:

- Branches are always to valid locations
- Data is always initialized and references are always type-safe
- Access to private or package private data and methods is rigidly controlled

The first two of these checks take place primarily during the verification step that occurs when a class is loaded and made eligible for use. The third is primarily performed dynamically, when data items or methods of a class are first accessed by another class.

The verifier permits only some bytecode sequences in valid programs, e.g. a jump (branch) instruction can only target an instruction within the same method. Furthermore, the verifier ensures that any given instruction operates on a fixed stack location, allowing the JIT compiler to transform stack accesses into fixed register accesses. Because of this, that the JVM is a stack architecture does not imply a speed penalty for emulation on register-based architectures when using a JIT compiler. In the face of the code-verified JVM architecture, it makes no difference to a JIT compiler whether it gets named imaginary registers or imaginary stack positions that must be allocated to the target architecture's registers. In fact, code verification makes the JVM different from a classic stack architecture, of which efficient emulation with a JIT compiler is more complicated and typically carried out by a slower interpreter. Additionally, the Interpreter used by the default JVM is a special type known as a Template Interpreter, which translates bytecode directly to native, register based machine language rather than emulate a stack like a typical interpreter. In many aspects the HotSpot Interpreter can be considered a JIT compiler rather than a true interpreter, meaning the stack architecture that the bytecode targets is not actually used in the implementation, but merely a specification for the intermediate representation that can well be implemented in a register based architecture. Another instance of a stack architecture being merely a specification and implemented in a register based virtual machine is the Common Language Runtime.

The original specification for the bytecode verifier used natural language that was incomplete or incorrect in some respects. A number of attempts have been made to specify the JVM as a formal system. By doing this, the security of current JVM implementations can more thoroughly be analyzed, and potential security exploits prevented. It will also be possible to optimize the JVM by skipping unnecessary safety checks, if the application being run is proven to be safe.

==== Secure execution of remote code ====
A virtual machine architecture allows very fine-grained control over the actions that code within the machine is permitted to take. It assumes the code is "semantically" correct, that is, it successfully passed the (formal) bytecode verifier process, materialized by a tool, possibly off-board the virtual machine. This is designed to allow safe execution of untrusted code from remote sources, a model used by Java applets, and other secure code downloads. Once bytecode-verified, the downloaded code runs in a restricted "sandbox", which is designed to protect the user from misbehaving or malicious code. As an addition to the bytecode verification process, publishers can purchase a certificate with which to digitally sign applets as safe, giving them permission to ask the user to break out of the sandbox and access the local file system, clipboard, execute external pieces of software, or network.

Formal proof of bytecode verifiers have been done by the Javacard industry (Formal Development of an Embedded Verifier for Java Card Byte Code)

=== Bytecode interpreter and Just-in-Time compiler ===
For each hardware architecture a different Java bytecode interpreter is needed. When a computer has a Java bytecode interpreter, it can run any Java bytecode program, and the same program can be run on any computer that has such an interpreter.

When Java bytecode is executed by an interpreter, the execution will always be slower than the execution of the same program compiled into native machine language. This problem is mitigated by just-in-time (JIT) compilers for executing Java bytecode. A JIT compiler may translate Java bytecode into native machine language while executing the program. The translated parts of the program can then be executed much more quickly than they could be interpreted. This technique gets applied to those parts of a program frequently executed. This way a JIT compiler can significantly speed up the overall execution time.

There is no necessary connection between the Java programming language and Java bytecode. A program written in Java can be compiled directly into the machine language of a real computer and programs written in other languages than Java can be compiled into Java bytecode.

Java bytecode is intended to be platform-independent and secure. Some JVM implementations do not include an interpreter, but consist only of a just-in-time compiler.

=== Java Native Interface ===
The Java Native Interface (or Native Method Interface) is a foreign function interface (non-Java) programming framework which enables Java code running in a Java virtual machine (JVM) to call and be called by native applications (programs specific to a hardware and operating system platform) and libraries written in other languages such as C, C++ and assembly.

Java 22 introduces the Foreign Function and Memory API, which can be seen as the successor to Java Native Interface.

Native methods are enabled by JNI to handle situations when an application cannot be written entirely in the Java programming language, e.g. when the standard Java class library does not support the platform-specific features or program library.

The JNI framework lets a native method use Java objects in the same way that Java code uses these objects. A native method can create Java objects and then inspect and use these objects to perform its tasks. A native method can also inspect and use objects created by Java application code.

JNI also allows direct access to assembly code, without even going through a C bridge. Accessing Java applications from assembly is possible in the same way.

== JVM in the web browser ==
At the start of the Java platform's lifetime, the JVM was marketed as a web technology for creating Rich Web Applications. As of 2018, most web browsers and operating systems bundling web browsers do not ship with a Java plug-in, nor do they permit side-loading any non-Flash plug-in. The Java browser plugin was deprecated in JDK 9.

The NPAPI Java browser plug-in was designed to allow the JVM to execute so-called Java applets embedded into HTML pages. For browsers with the plug-in installed, the applet is allowed to draw into a rectangular region on the page assigned to it. Because the plug-in includes a JVM, Java applets are not restricted to the Java programming language; any language targeting the JVM may run in the plug-in. A restricted set of APIs allow applets access to the user's microphone or 3D acceleration, although applets are not able to modify the page outside its rectangular region. Adobe Flash Player, the main competing technology, works in the same way in this respect.

As of June 2015 according to W3Techs, Java applet and Silverlight use had fallen to 0.1% each for all web sites, while Flash had fallen to 10.8%.

=== JavaScript JVMs and interpreters ===
Since May 2016, JavaPoly allows users to import unmodified Java libraries, and invoke them directly from JavaScript. JavaPoly allows websites to use unmodified Java libraries, even if the user does not have Java installed on their computer.

=== Transpilation to JavaScript ===
With the continuing improvements in JavaScript execution speed, combined with the increased use of mobile devices whose web browsers do not implement support for plugins, there are efforts to target those users through transpilation to JavaScript. It is possible to either transpile the source code or JVM bytecode to JavaScript.

Compiling the JVM bytecode, which is universal across JVM languages, allows building upon the language's existing compiler to bytecode. The main JVM bytecode to JavaScript transpilers are TeaVM, the compiler contained in Dragome Web SDK, Bck2Brwsr, and j2js-compiler.

Leading transpilers from JVM languages to JavaScript include the Java-to-JavaScript transpiler contained in Google Web Toolkit, J2CL, Clojurescript (Clojure), GrooScript (Apache Groovy), Scala.js (Scala) and others.

== See also ==
- Automated exception handling
- Common Language Runtime
- Comparison of application virtualization software
- Comparison of Java virtual machines
- Java Native Interface
- Java performance
- Java processor
- K virtual machine (KVM)
- List of Java virtual machines
- List of JVM languages
- GNU Compiler for Java, a Java implementation that does not rely on a JVM
