= IcedTea =

Java-related build and integration project

IcedTea for OpenJDK 8
- Developer: GNU Classpath
- Stable release: 3.33.0 / November 4, 2024; 22 months ago
- Written in: C, C++, Java
- Operating system: Linux, *BSD, macOS, Solaris, Windows
- Platform: IA-32, x86-64, ARM, AArch64, SPARC, SPARC64, PowerPC, ppc64, ppc64le, s390, s390x
- Type: Java virtual machine and library
- License: GNU GPL+linking exception
- Website: icedtea.classpath.org
- Repository: github.com/icedtea-git/icedtea/tree/3.0

IcedTea for OpenJDK 7
- Developer: GNU Classpath (with Red Hat until 2.6.22)
- Stable release: 2.6.28 / November 8, 2021; 4 years ago
- Written in: C, C++, Java
- Operating system: Linux, *BSD, macOS, Solaris, Windows
- Platform: IA-32, x86-64, ARM, AArch64, SPARC, SPARC64, PowerPC, ppc64, ppc64le, s390, s390x
- Type: Java virtual machine and library
- License: GNU GPL+linking exception
- Website: icedtea.classpath.org
- Repository: github.com/icedtea-git/icedtea/tree/2.6

IcedTea for OpenJDK 6
- Developers: Red Hat, GNU Classpath
- Final release: 1.13.13 / January 9, 2017; 9 years ago
- Written in: C, C++, Java
- Operating system: Linux, *BSD, macOS, Solaris, Windows
- Platform: IA-32, x86-64, ARM, SPARC, SPARC64, PowerPC, ppc64, s390, s390x
- Type: Java virtual machine and library
- License: GPL+linking exception
- Website: icedtea.classpath.org
- Repository: icedtea.classpath.org/hg/icedtea6

IcedTea-Web
- Developers: Red Hat, GNU Classpath
- Stable release: 1.8.8 (binaries) / October 28, 2021; 4 years ago
- Written in: C++, Java
- Operating system: Linux, *BSD, OS X, Solaris, Windows
- Type: Java Web Start support and Java web plug-in for applets
- License: GPL+linking exception
- Website: icedtea.classpath.org/wiki/IcedTea-Web
- Repository: github.com/AdoptOpenJDK/icedtea-web

IcedTea-Sound
- Developers: Red Hat, GNU Classpath
- Stable release: 1.0.1 / July 18, 2014; 12 years ago
- Written in: C and Java
- Operating system: Linux, *BSD, OS X, Solaris, Windows
- Type: Sound support
- License: GPL+linking exception
- Website: icedtea.classpath.org/wiki/IcedTea-Sound
- Repository: icedtea.classpath.org/hg/icedtea-sound/

IcedTea is a build and integration project for OpenJDK launched by Red Hat in June 2007. IcedTea also includes some addon libraries: IcedTea-Web is a free software implementation of Java Web Start and the Java web browser applet plug-in. IcedTea-Sound is a set of plug-ins for the Java sound subsystem, including the PulseAudio provider which used to be included with IcedTea. The Free Software Foundation recommends that all Java programmers use IcedTea as their development environment.

Historically, the initial goal of the IcedTea project was to make the OpenJDK software, which Sun Microsystems released as free software in 2007, usable without needing any proprietary software, and hence make it possible to add OpenJDK to Fedora Linux and other Linux distributions that insist on free software. This goal was met, and a version of IcedTea based on OpenJDK was packaged with Fedora 8 in November 2007. April 2008 saw the first release of a new variant, IcedTea6, which is based on Sun's build drops of OpenJDK6, a fork of the OpenJDK with the goal of being compatible with the existing JDK6. This was released in Ubuntu and Fedora in May 2008. The IcedTea package in these distributions has been renamed to OpenJDK using the OpenJDK trademark notice. In June 2008, the Fedora build passed Sun's rigorous Technology Compatibility Kit (TCK) testing on x86 and x86-64. IcedTea 2, the first version based on OpenJDK 7, was released in October 2011. IcedTea 3, the first version based on OpenJDK 8, was released in April 2016. Support for IcedTea 1 was dropped in January 2017.

== History ==
This project was created following Sun's release under open source licenses of its HotSpot Virtual Machine and Java compiler in November 2006, and most of the source code of the class library in May 2007. However, parts of the class library, such as font rendering, colour management and sound support, were only provided as proprietary binary plug-ins. This was because the source code for these plug-ins was copyrighted to third parties, rather than Sun Microsystems. The released parts were published under the terms of the GNU General Public License, a free software license.

Due to these missing components, it was not possible to build OpenJDK only with free software components. Sun aimed to negotiate with the license holders to allow this code to be released under a free software license, or failing that, to replace these proprietary elements with alternative implementations. With the plug-ins replaced, the class library would then be completely free. Sun has continued to use the proprietary code in their certified binary releases.

Following the announcement, the IcedTea project was started and was formally announced on June 7, 2007, with a build repository provided by the GNU Classpath team. The team could not call their software product "OpenJDK" because this is a trademark which was owned by Sun Microsystems. They instead decided to use the temporary name "IcedTea".

On November 5, 2007, Red Hat signed both the Sun Contributor Agreement and the OpenJDK Community Technology Compatibility Kit (TCK) License. The press release suggested that this would benefit the IcedTea project. Simon Phipps suggested the possibility of IcedTea being hosted on openjdk.java.net, and Mark Reinhold noted that signing the copyright assignment could allow Red Hat to contribute parts of IcedTea to Sun for inclusion in the mainstream JDK.

Since then, a number of patches from IcedTea have made their way into OpenJDK.

In June 2008, it was announced that IcedTea6 (as the packaged version of OpenJDK on Fedora Linux 9) has passed the (TCK) tests and can claim to be a fully compatible Java 6 implementation. The project continues to track OpenJDK 6, OpenJDK 7 and OpenJDK 8 development in separate repositories, and contribute patches back upstream where possible; the current state of each IcedTea patch is maintained on the IcedTea wiki.

== Aims ==
The IcedTea project started with two aims:

1. to make it possible for the GNU Compiler for Java to compile the OpenJDK code. OpenJDK presented a bootstrapping question of itself being written in Java. Hence, developers needed an already-working Java compiler and runtime in order to build OpenJDK. Originally, only the existing proprietary Sun JDK met that requirement. Free distributions like Fedora can't depend on proprietary tools in order to build packages, so the IcedTea project had to make it possible to compile the code using free software. When this was done, the resulting IcedTea version of OpenJDK could be used to compile itself, thus escaping the need to use non-Free software for future compiling.
2. to provide free equivalents of the binary plug-ins that existed in OpenJDK because Sun was unable to release all the source code. As of March 2008, this is no longer needed for IcedTea6, as the OpenJDK 6 build drops can be built with no binary plug-ins. With the release of b10, which replaces the proprietary sound support with that from the Gervill project, a full implementation of Java 1.6 can be built without binary plug-ins. The only remaining binary plug is for SNMP support, which is an optional provider for the Java Management Extensions (JMX) architecture and not part of the specification. As of b53 in April 2009, the same is true for OpenJDK 7. Outside the core of OpenJDK, binary plug-ins are still needed for using Java Web Start applets that run using the browser plug-in (distinct from the core plug-ins discussed earlier); as of 2013, the only source code available that accomplishes this goal is the IcedTea-Web project.

== Other benefits ==
IcedTea also provides a more familiar build system by providing a wrapper around the OpenJDK makefiles using the GNU Autotools. This removes the need to remember numerous environment variables for configuring the build. (The current IcedTea builds set roughly forty such variables for the underlying OpenJDK build.) It has also provided a place for early work on features which will eventually appear in the main OpenJDK builds such as Gervill and for work on ports to other platforms.

=== IcedTea-Web ===
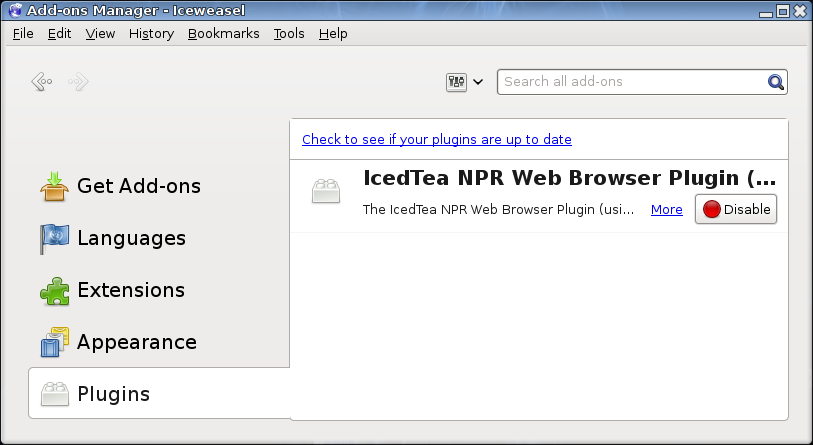
IcedTea NPR plug-in (based on IcedTea6) listed in Debian Iceweasel 6.0.2 (Knoppix 6.7.1)

IcedTea-web provides a free-software Java Web browser plug-in. It was the first to work in 64-bit browsers under 64-bit Linux, a feature Sun's proprietary JRE later addressed. This makes it suitable to enable support for Java applets in 64-bit Mozilla Firefox, among others. IcedTea-web also provides a free Java Web Start (Java Network Launching Protocol (JNLP)) implementation. Sun had promised to release their plug-in and Web Start implementation as part of OpenJDK. Despite pressure from the community, Sun Microsystems did not succeed in doing so before the company was acquired by Oracle. Development on the IcedTea-web plug-in continues, with the latest version of the next-generation plug-in supporting Google's Chromium and Mozilla's Firefox. Since 2011, development occurs in the separate IcedTea-Web project. As of April 2013, Oracle has kept the codebase of the Java plug-in fully proprietary, in contrast to the remainder of OpenJDK. As of December, 2017, IcedTea-Web 1.7.1 adds support for jdk9.

As of October 2018, Oracle has announced that public Java Web Start support will end with Java SE 11. In March 2019 the icedtea-web source code was donated to the AdoptOpenJDK project. Based on this the sources and issue management of IcedTea-Web were migrated to GitHub. One goal of the migration is to provide an integration for the Java 8 releases of AdoptOpenJDK, and provide JDK vendor independent installers for IcedTea-Web. The integration project is a cooperation between the AdoptOpenJDK community, Red Hat, and Karakun AG. The project for the installers is named OpenWebStart and first information can be found here.

== Progress and availability ==
From June 2007, IcedTea was able to build itself and pass a significant portion of Mauve, the GNU Classpath test suite. In May 2008, support was added to IcedTea for running the Sun jtreg regression tests.

IcedTea has become popular among package maintainers for the following Linux distributions as of April 2012:

- IcedTea is the default JVM in Ark Linux and Arch Linux.
- It can be built and run under Debian. Packages entered unstable on 12 July 2008. As of May 2022, packages icedtea-netx and icedtea-netx-common are available in official Debian repositories for at least Debian 9 through 12.
- IcedTea[7] was available in Fedora Linux 8 and IcedTea6 appeared in Fedora 9 through to 17 as java-1.6.0-openjdk. A java-1.7.0-openjdk package using the IcedTea 2.x OpenJDK forest, but not its build system, first appeared in Fedora 16.
- Binary and source packages for IcedTea 3.x are available in Gentoo Linux's official repository. A source package for IcedTea 2.x continues to be maintaining in the Java overlay repository. Installing a Java application by default pulls in IcedTea instead of oracle-jdk because it can be installed without extra work from the user, as users have to manually agree to Oracle's EULA to download the oracle-jdk.
- IcedTea is available in Ubuntu 7.10 (Gutsy Gibbon), from the "universe" repository, and IcedTea6 in 8.04 (Hardy Heron). Starting with Ubuntu 11.04 only IcedTea is available.

== Architecture ==
OpenJDK contained approximately (on release in May 2007) 4% encumbered code, which was only packaged as binary plug-ins. These were needed to build and use the JDK. OpenJDK 6 was released with only 1% encumbered code, and the encumbered sound support has also since been replaced. IcedTea6 is based on this release. IcedTea still provides its own web browser plug-in and Web Start support, as Sun's implementation remains proprietary.

IcedTea 1.x and 2.x can compile OpenJDK using GNU Classpath-based solutions such as GNU Compiler for Java (GCJ) and optionally bootstraps itself using the HotSpot Java virtual machine and the javac Java compiler it just built. For now, building IcedTea 3.x requires using IcedTea 2.x or 3.x, or an OpenJDK 7 or 8 build from another source.

== Platform support ==
Cross-architecture ports of HotSpot (OpenJDK's Virtual Machine) are difficult, because the code contains much assembly language, along with the C++ core. The IcedTea project has developed a generic port of the HotSpot interpreter called zero-assembler Hotspot (or zero), with almost no assembly code. This port is intended to allow the interpreter part of HotSpot to be very easily adapted to any Linux processor architecture. The code of zero-assembler Hotspot was used for all the non-x86 ports of HotSpot (PPC, IA-64, S390 and ARM) from version 1.6 of IcedTea7.

The IcedTea project has also developed a platform-independent just-in-time compiler called Shark for HotSpot, using LLVM, to complement Zero. This was included in upstream OpenJDK in August 2010. A JIT for ARM32 was first included in 1.6.0 and 2.1.1. A native port to AArch64 from Red Hat appeared in 2.4.6 and a native PPC64 port from SAP/IBM will be included in 2.5.0. The PPC/AIX port is included upstream in OpenJDK from version 8u20, and the AArch64 port will be included from version 9.

== See also ==
- Free Java implementations
- Apache Harmony
- Gnash (software)
- FlashPaper
