= Workbench (disambiguation) =

A workbench is a sturdy table at which manual work is done.

Workbench may also refer to:

== Furniture ==
- Welding table, a machine shop workbench, usually made of metal
- Workbench (woodworking), a specialized table used by woodworkers

== Software ==
- Language workbench, tools that enable software development in the language-oriented software development paradigm

=== Databases ===
- Database Workbench, SQL development and administration tool for multiple databases
- MySQL Workbench, a visual database design and management tool for the MySQL database system

=== Unix ===
- PWB/UNIX or Programmer's Workbench, an early version of the Unix operating system
- Writer's Workbench, one of the earliest grammar checkers to receive wide usage on Unix systems

=== Other software ===
- Genie Workbench, film and television production software
- Open Workbench, a free project management software focused on scheduling
- Taverna Workbench, a former open source tool for designing and executing workflows
- The Geochemist's Workbench, software tools for aqueous chemistry using geochemical codes in a graphic interface
- WorkBench, a tool for preparing text for use in BitFunnel, the search engine indexing algorithm
- Workbench (AmigaOS), the desktop (or "workbench") environment and graphical file manager of the Amiga computer

== Other ==
- National Instruments Electronics Workbench Group, part of the company National Instruments which develops electronic circuit designs
- Workbench Songs, 2006 album by Guy Clark

== See also ==
- Work station (disambiguation)
