= Workmate =

Workmate may refer to:

- Co-worker
- Workbench
- Black & Decker Workmate, a portable sawhorse and general carpentry tool.
