= Backsplash =

Backsplash may refer to:

- Backsplash (rowing), Splashing of water resulting from an activity or operation, such as in rowing or rotation of a paddle wheel of a paddle steamer
- Backsplash (interior), a protective panel behind a sink or countertop usually made of a waterproof material, also called a "splashback"
- An attraction at Geyser Falls Water Theme Park, in Choctaw, Mississippi, US
