= Work station =

Work station may refer to:

- Workstation, a high-performance desktop computer
- Music workstation, an electronic musical instrument
- Cubicle, a work space usually for one employee
- Computer desk, a piece of furniture

== See also ==
- Workbench (disambiguation)
