= Backsplash (interior) =

Back wall protection

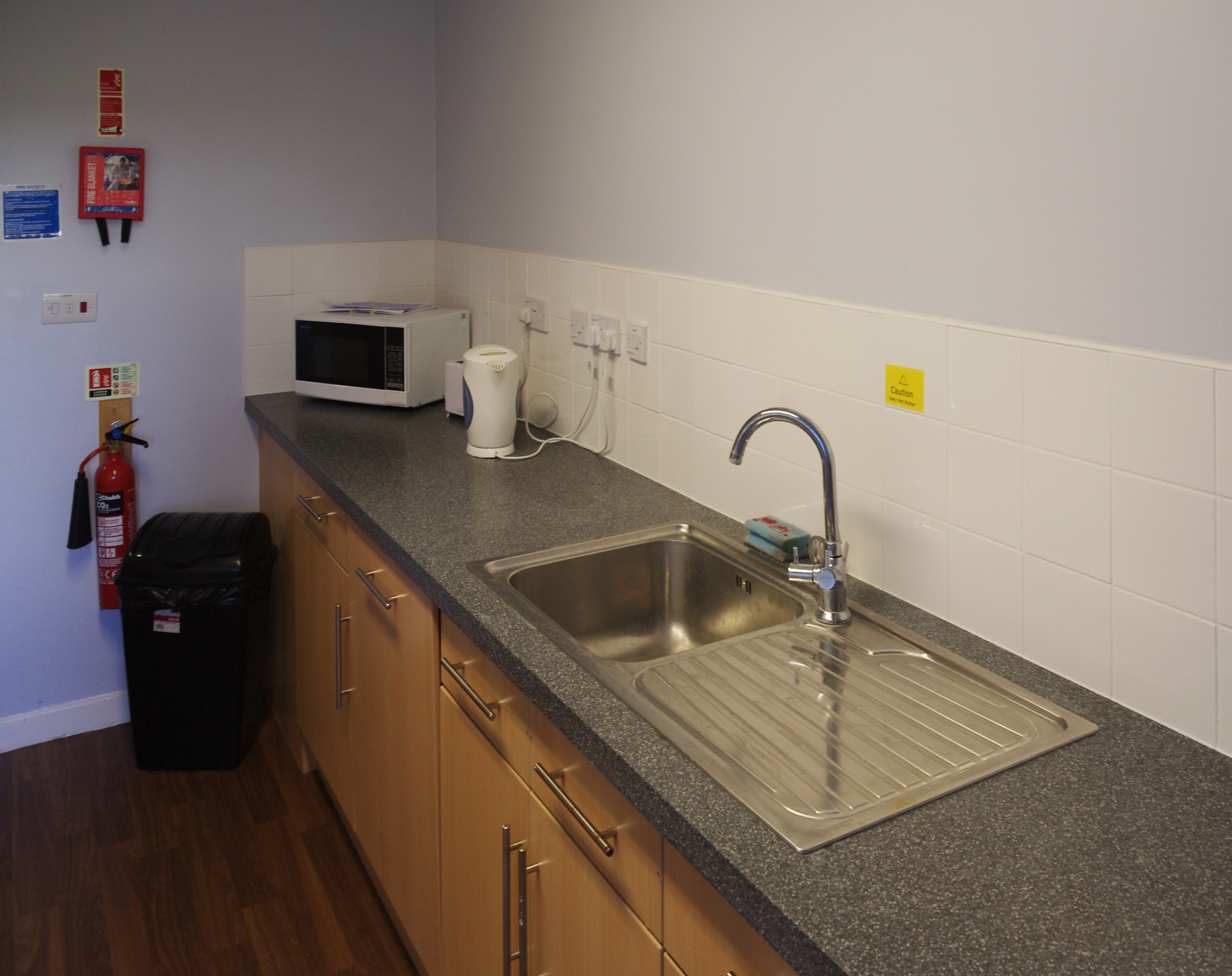
Kitchen wall with tiles as splashback

A backsplash or splashback is a protection for the back walls above a work surface where splashes may occur, for example of water and fat. It is common in kitchens, toilets and bathrooms, and can be made, for example, in the form of wall tiles or panels ("kitchen panels") of wood, particle board, glass or metal.

In sanitary areas such as bathrooms or toilets, splash guards can be placed over sinks to protect the wall from water splashes, or in other "wet zones" such as the walls behind showers and bathtubs.

In kitchens, they are most often placed above the countertop. The height of the splash guard usually extends from the countertop to the bottom edge of the wall cabinet, which typically means a length of about 50 to 60 cm. It mechanically protects the wall, and also makes it easier to remove grease splashes that occur, for example, during cooking. In the past, it was most common to make the protection of tiles, but other options such as glass, stainless steel and laminates have also become common. Porous materials should be avoided.

The design can vary greatly, and the splashback can be a design element in the interior. For example, it is possible to install tiles that continue very high up, sometimes all the way to the ceiling, or installing "half" backsplashes.

== Gallery ==
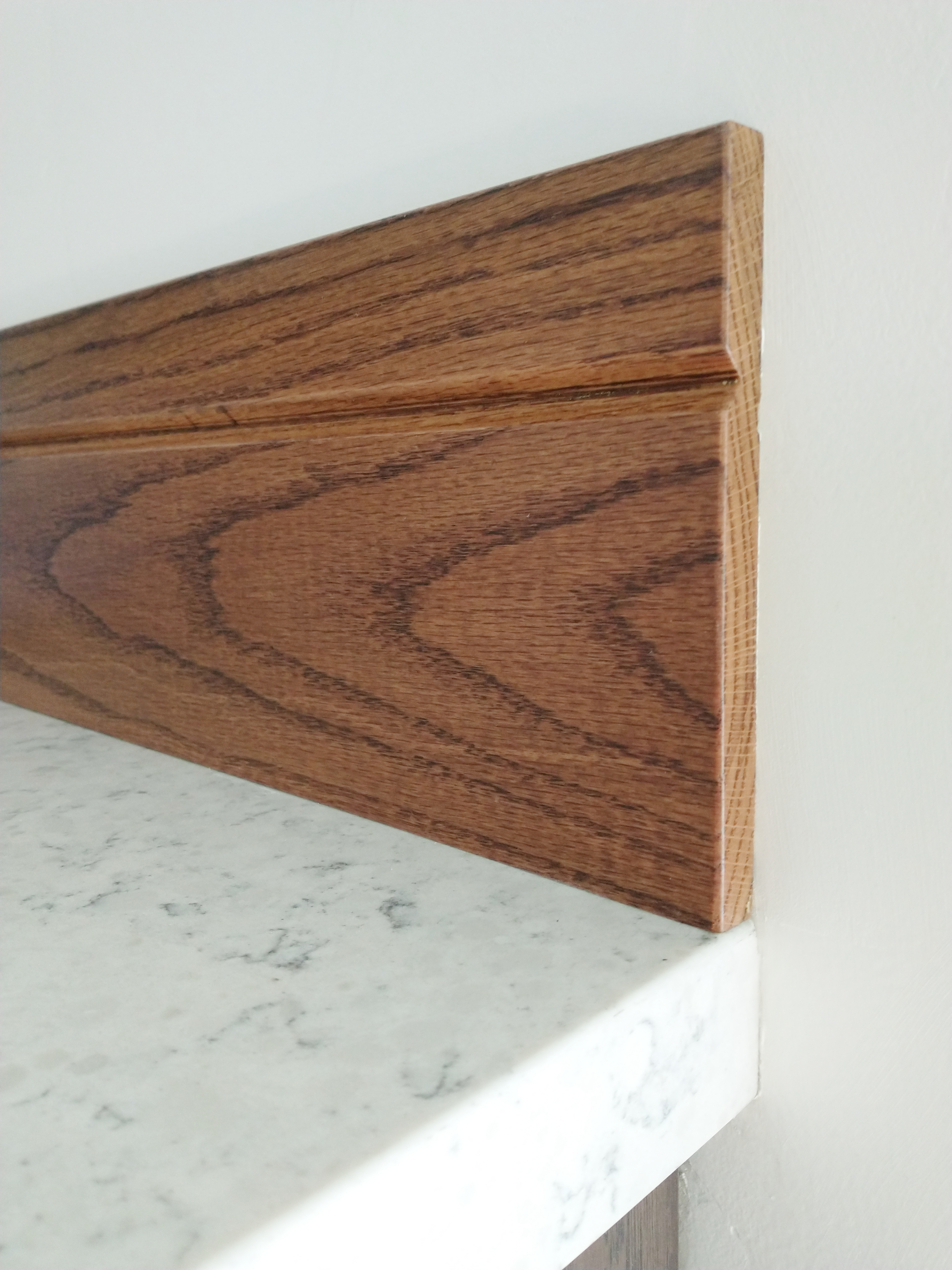
Low oak backsplash

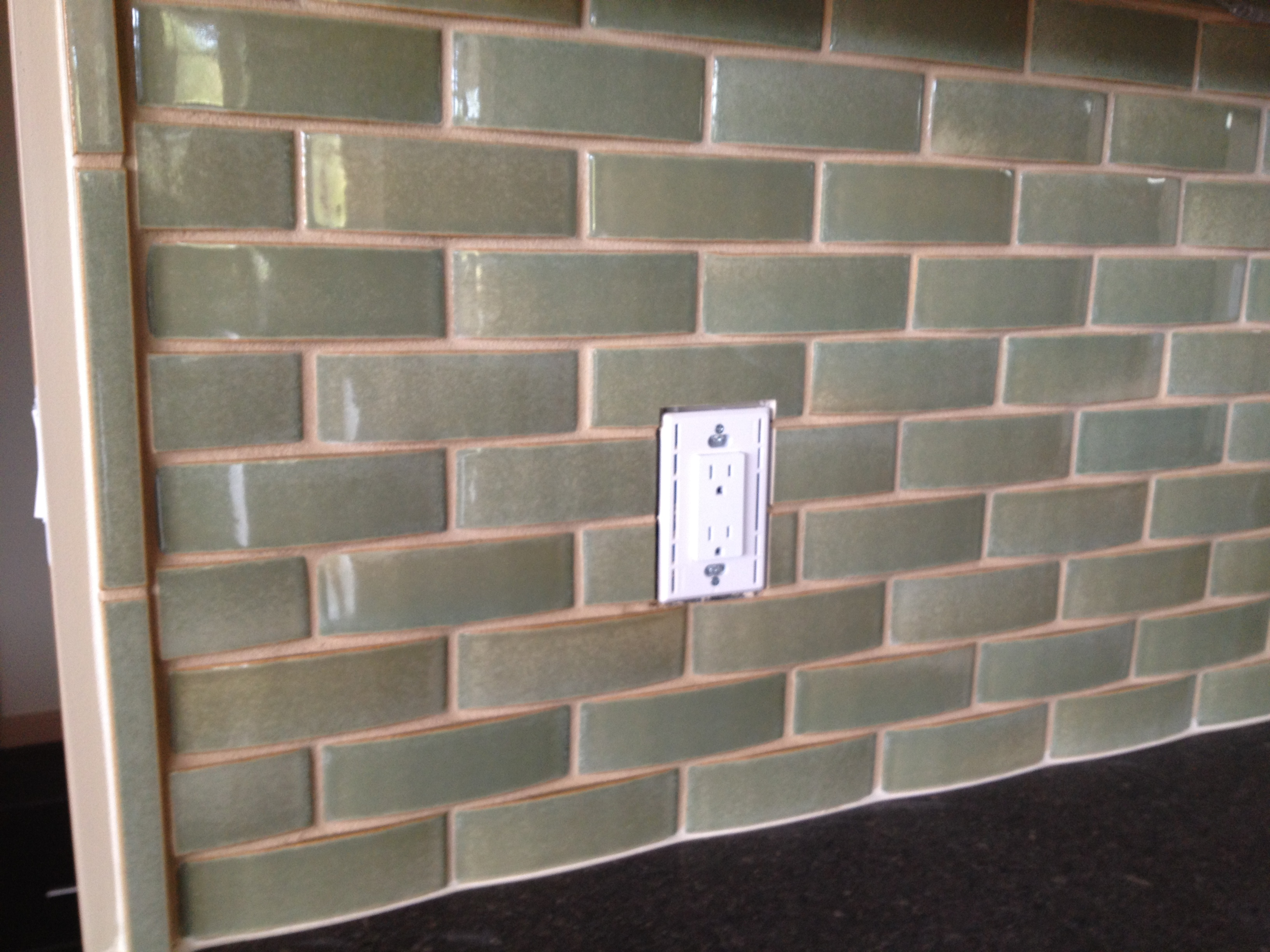
Ceramic tile backsplash

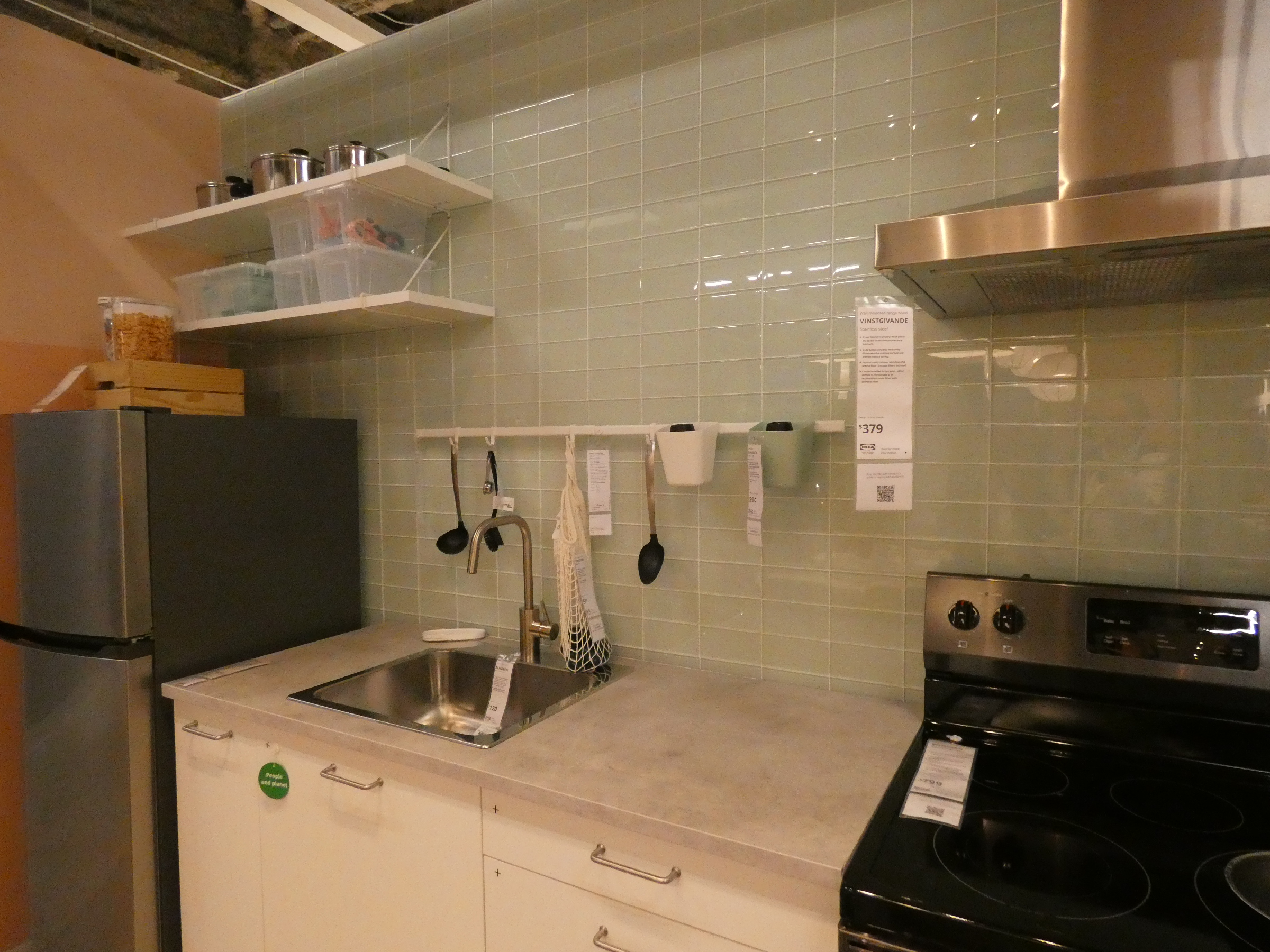
High tile backsplash

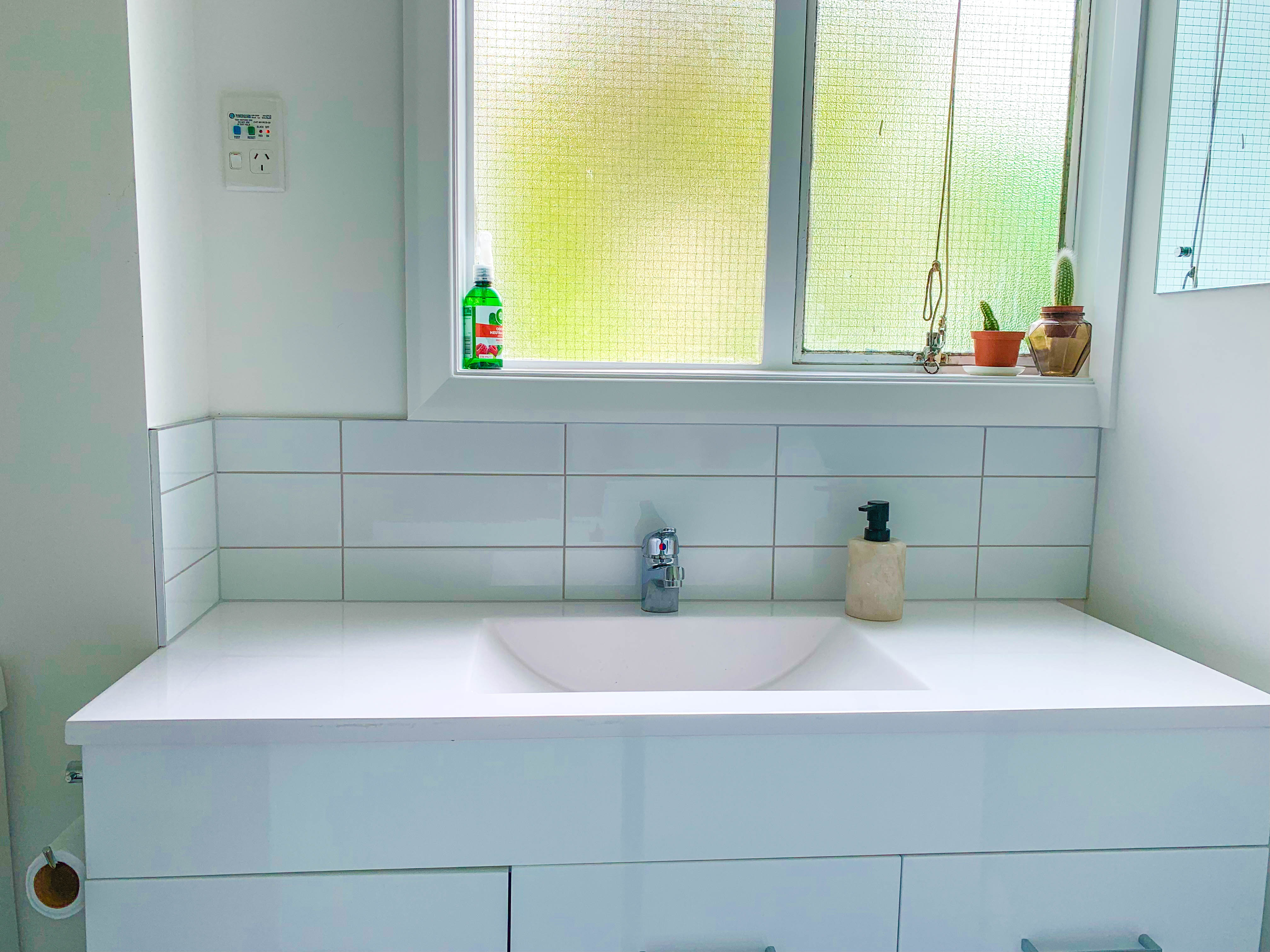
Bathroom sink backsplash

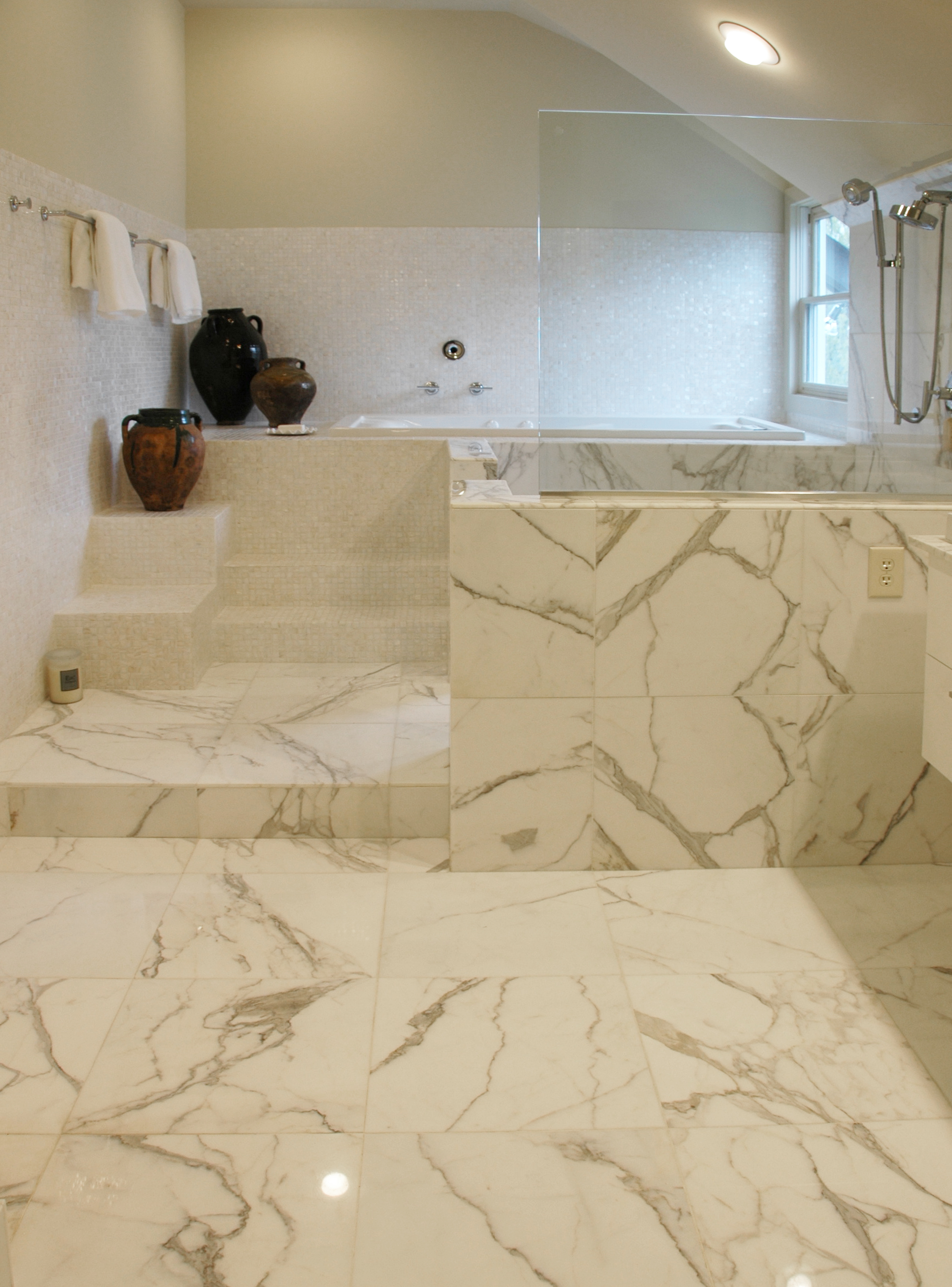
Backsplash tiles above a bathtub

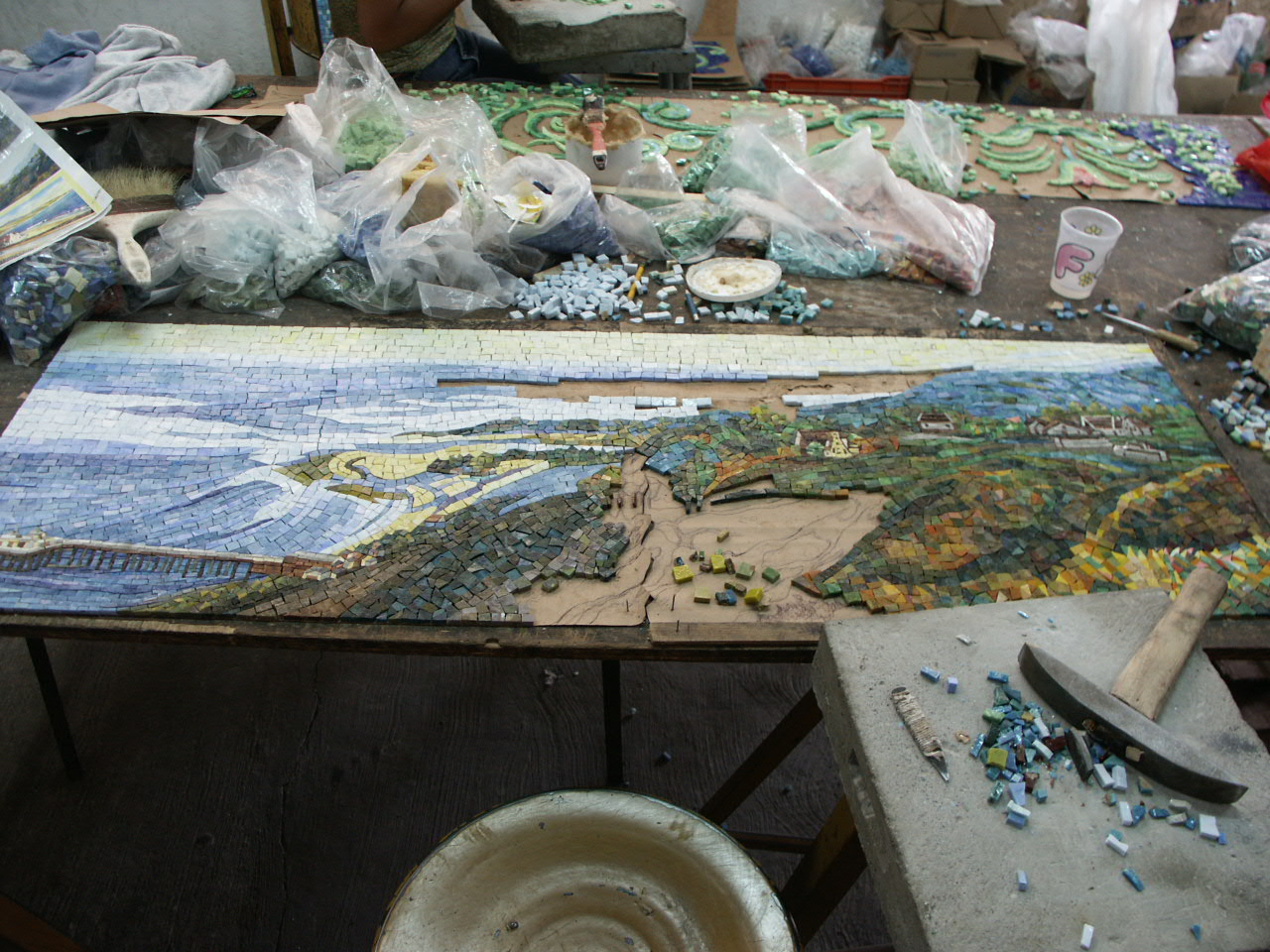
Mosaic backsplash

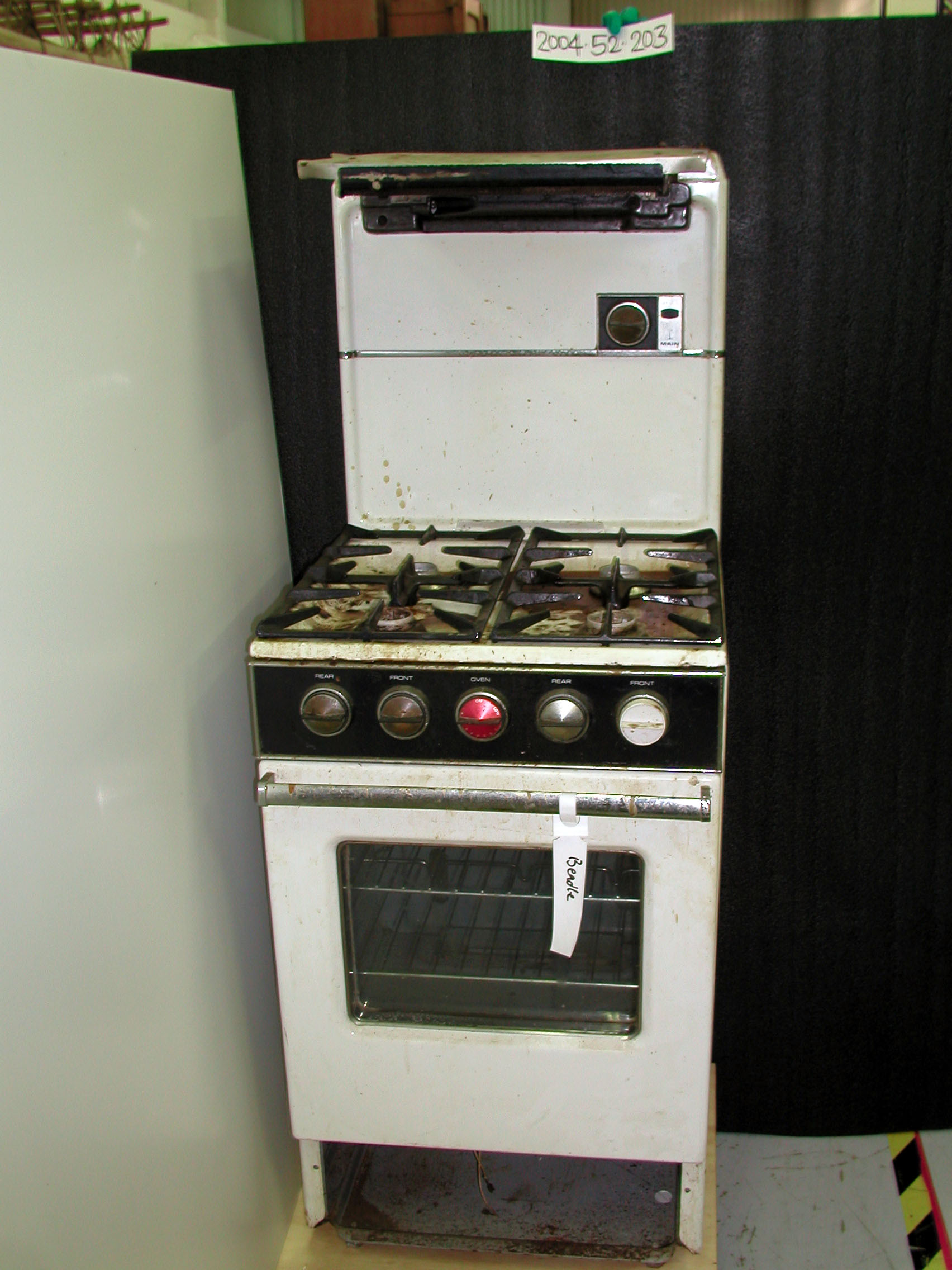
Stove with integrated backsplash
