= Mauve (test suite) =

- Operating system: Java virtual machine
- Type: Test Suite
- License: GNU General Public License
- Website: www.sourceware.org/mauve/

Mauve is a project to provide a free software test suite for the Java class libraries. Mauve is developed by the members of Kaffe, GNU Classpath, GCJ, and other projects. Unlike a similar project, JUnit, Mauve is designed to run on various experimental Java virtual machines, where some features may be still missing. Because of this, Mauve does not discover the testing method by name, as JUnit does. Mauve can also be used to test the user java application, not just the core class library. Mauve is released under GNU General Public License.

== Example ==
The "Hello world" example in Mauve:

// Tags: JDK1.4
public class HelloWorld implements Testlet {
  // Test if 3 * 2 = 6
  public void test(TestHarness harness) {
    harness.check(3 * 2, 6, "Multiplication failed.");    
  }
}

== See also ==
Technology Compatibility Kit
