= Elluminate Live =

Elluminate Inc.
- Industry: Education and Business conferences
- Area served: International
- Products: Web conferencing
- Website: Elluminate Inc. Home Page

Elluminate Live! was a web conferencing program developed by Elluminate Inc. Elluminate "rented out" virtual rooms or vSpaces where virtual schools and businesses can hold classes and meetings. Elluminate was acquired by Blackboard Inc. and renamed to Blackboard Collaborate. Blackboard subsequently deprecated Blackboard Collaborate in favor of Blackboard Collaborate Ultra which is WebRTC-based.

== Uses ==
While Elluminate is primarily designed and used for educational purposes, it is also used by training organizations and corporations. K12 Inc., Desire2learn, and several other schools and businesses use Elluminate live as part of their curriculum and meetings.

== Tools ==
A screenshot of the Elluminate Live program

Elluminate Live! communication tools include integrated Voice over IP and teleconferencing, public and private chat, quizzing and polling, emoticons, and a webcam tool. The software includes several visual tools, including whiteboard, application sharing, file transfer, and web tour. The software also includes a record feature that allows the moderator to record the class for others to watch later as well as a graphing tool, breakout rooms for group work, and timer. The whiteboard supports the uploading of presentations for viewing on the whiteboard for class or meeting.

== System requirements ==
To use Elluminate, the user needs Java Web Start or Java SE by Sun Microsystems. Elluminate Live is designed to be used on all computers, providing they have Java installed. Elluminate is also designed to work on Internet connections that include cable/DSL and 28.8 kbit/s or higher dialup connections.
