= Workshop =

Room or building, with tools, used to repair or make goods

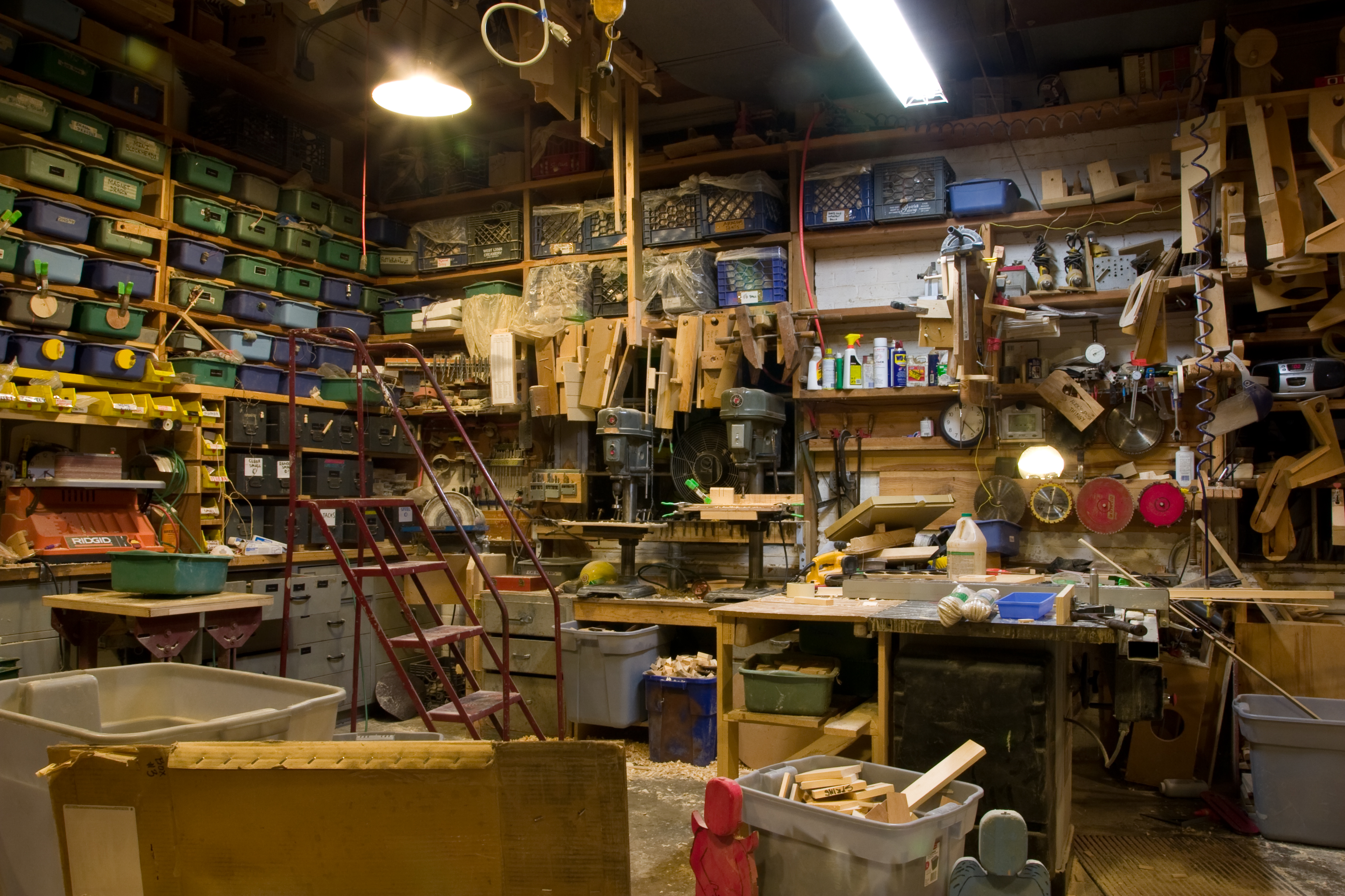
This museum workshop containing tools and supplies has been in use for decades.

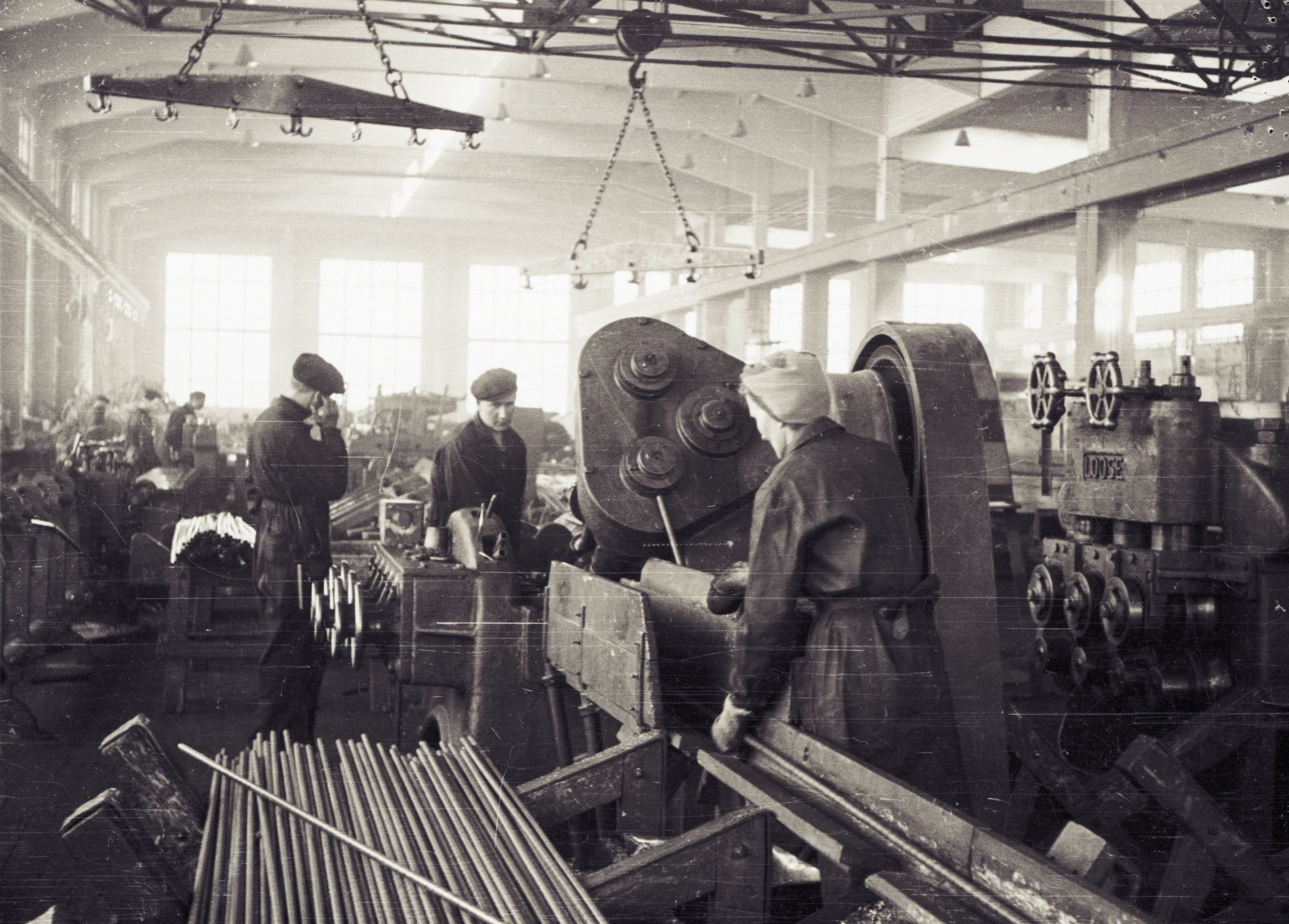
Metal workers at workshop in Tampere, Finland in 1955

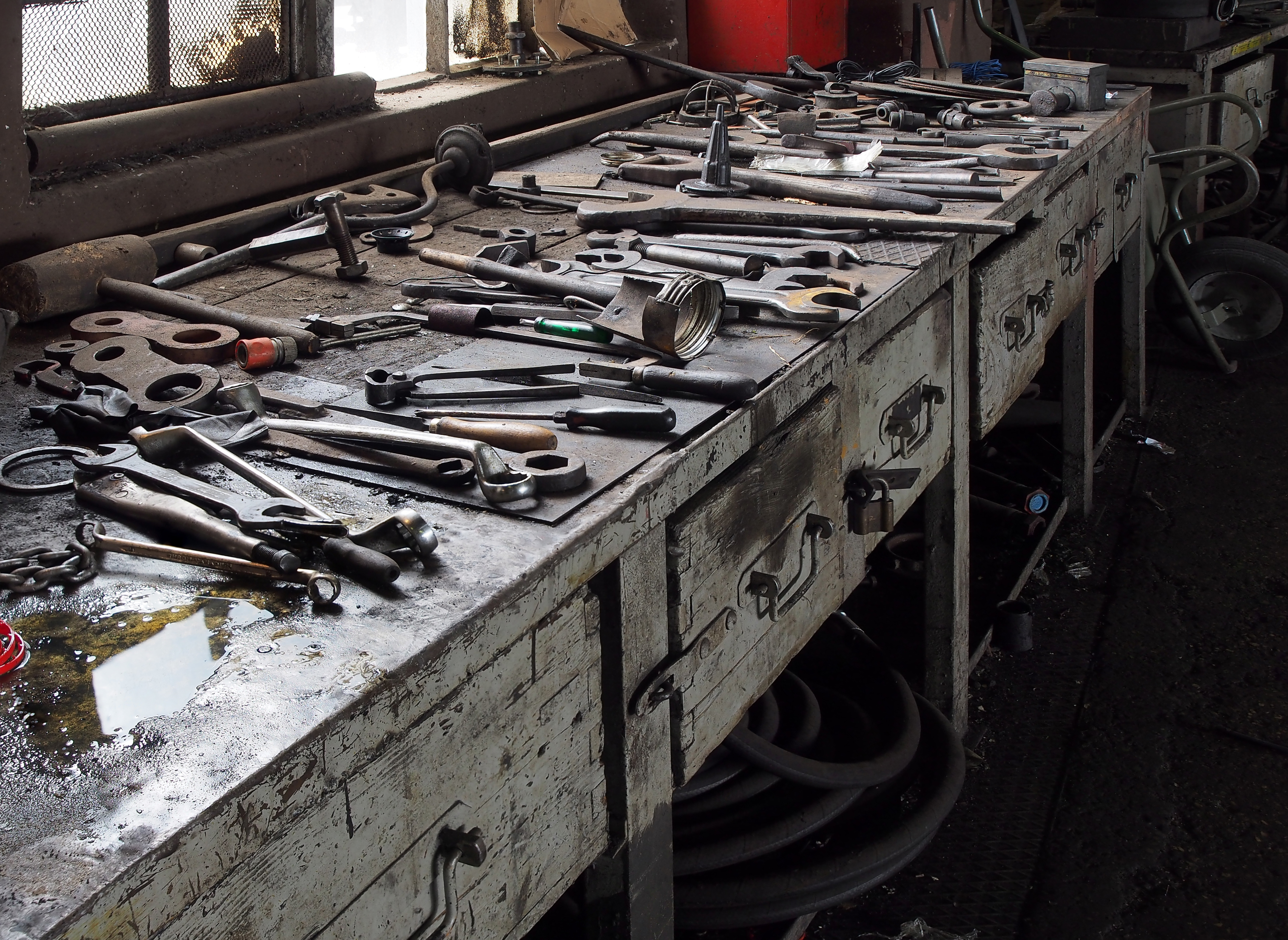
A railway workshop

Beginning with the Industrial Revolution era, a workshop may be a room, rooms or building which provides both the area and tools (or machinery) that may be required for the manufacture or repair of manufactured goods. Workshops were the only places of production until the advent of industrialization and the development of larger factories. In the 20th and 21st century, many Western homes contained a workshop in either the garage, basement, or an external shed. Home workshops typically contain a workbench, hand tools, power tools, and other hardware. Along with the practical application of repairing goods, workshops are often used to tinker and make prototypes.

Some workshops focus exclusively on automotive repair or restoration although there are a variety of workshops in existence today. Woodworking, metalworking, electronics, and other types of electronic prototyping workshops are among the most common.

== Backshop ==
In some repair industries, such as locomotives and aircraft, the repair operations have specialized workshops called back shops or railway workshops. Most repairs are carried out in small workshops, except where an industrial service is needed.

== See also ==
- Hackspace
- Laboratory
- Machine shop, with machines for metalworking
- Skylab orbital workshop
- Studio
- The New Yankee Workshop
- Welding table
- Woodshop
