= Genie Workbench =

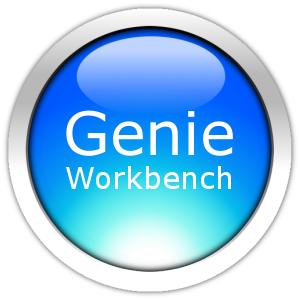
- Original author: Genie Workbench
- Release: 2009
- Written in: Java
- Operating system: Cross-platform
- Type: Film Production Software
- License: BSD License
- Website: Genie Workbench on Google Code

Genie Workbench is a suite of film and television production software that assist filmmakers in various production tasks. Genie Workbench is the result of the collaboration between the Business Process Management Group (BPM Group) of Queensland University of Technology (QUT) and the Centre for Screen Business (CSB) of The Australia Film Television and Radio School (AFTRS). Genie Workbench is released as an Open Source software under the BSD License and hosted on Google Code.

== History ==
In 2005, the Australian Research Council Centre of Excellence for Creative Industries and Innovation (CCI) invited QUT and AFTRS into one of CCi's research track "Enterprise Formation and Sustainability" under the project title "Business Process Management". The objective of this research track is to "Bring BPM to the Creative Industries".

In 2007, the research team embarked on the YAWL4Film initiative. Inspired by Yet Another Workflow Language (YAWL), YAWL4Film explores the creation of tangible software artifacts that aim to automate many film production imperatives. The first prototype of YAWL4Film focusing on production life cycle was based directly on YAWL Process Model and was successfully tested on two AFTRS student projects.

In May 2008, a revised prototype focusing on call sheet generation of YAWL4Film was successfully pilot run on a full feature film. Having this initial success, the YAWL4Film team started designing and working on Genie Workbench. The team took a role-based approach to design and developed Genie Workbench based on the roles held by key-appointment holders in a production setting (i.e. assistant directors). The result is set of software modules specifically developed for different roles.

The first version of Genie Workbench was launched on 27 March 2009. This phase consists of three software modules, namely: Genie Schedule, Genie Cast and Genie Crew. All three software modules are free to install and use, using Java Web Start. Each module runs as a software application on the desktop (supporting both Mac OS and Microsoft Windows). On 25 May 2009, v0.1.2 of the Genie Workbench was launched. The software is now aligned with Mac OS and Microsoft Windows (supporting .dmg and .exe setup files). Support for Java Web Start is available for users who have downloaded v0.1 but is not prevalent.

== Software modules ==
=== Genie Schedule ===
Genie Schedule
- Platform: Cross-platform
- License: BSD License
- Website: code.google.com/p/genieworkbench/

Genie Schedule is a film production scheduler. It provides a drag-n-drop interface on both stripboard and calendar view. Schedules can be created in PDF format and printed out. It is intended for producers and assistant directors who performs production scheduling. The Genie Schedule icon is inspired by the scene strips on a stripboard.

=== Genie Cast ===
Genie Cast
- Platform: Cross-platform
- License: BSD License
- Website: code.google.com/p/genieworkbench/

Genie Cast is an artist contact management software. It supports the shortlisting and casting process based on the character list, and is intended for casting directors and managers. The Genie Cast icon is inspired by inverting the shape of a mask to form a triangle.

=== Genie Crew ===
Genie Crew
- Platform: Cross-platform
- License: BSD License
- Website: code.google.com/p/genieworkbench/

Genie Crew is a production crew contact management software intended for producers and production managers. The Genie Crew icon is inspired by the shape of a camera lens.
