= Black & Decker Workmate =

General purpose, portable workbench

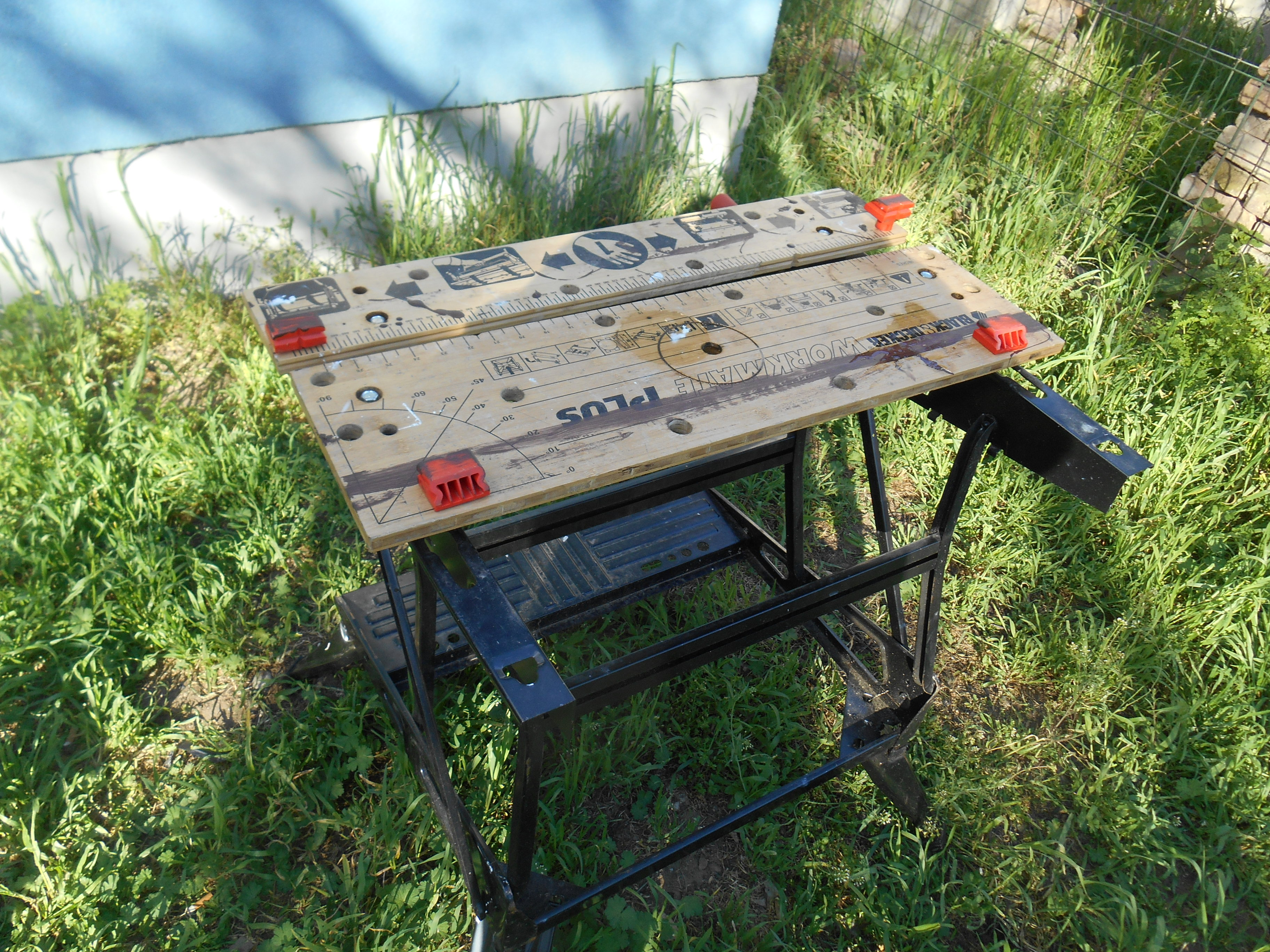
A "Workmate Plus", scored with a holesaw and licked with paint, as a result of general "do it yourself"

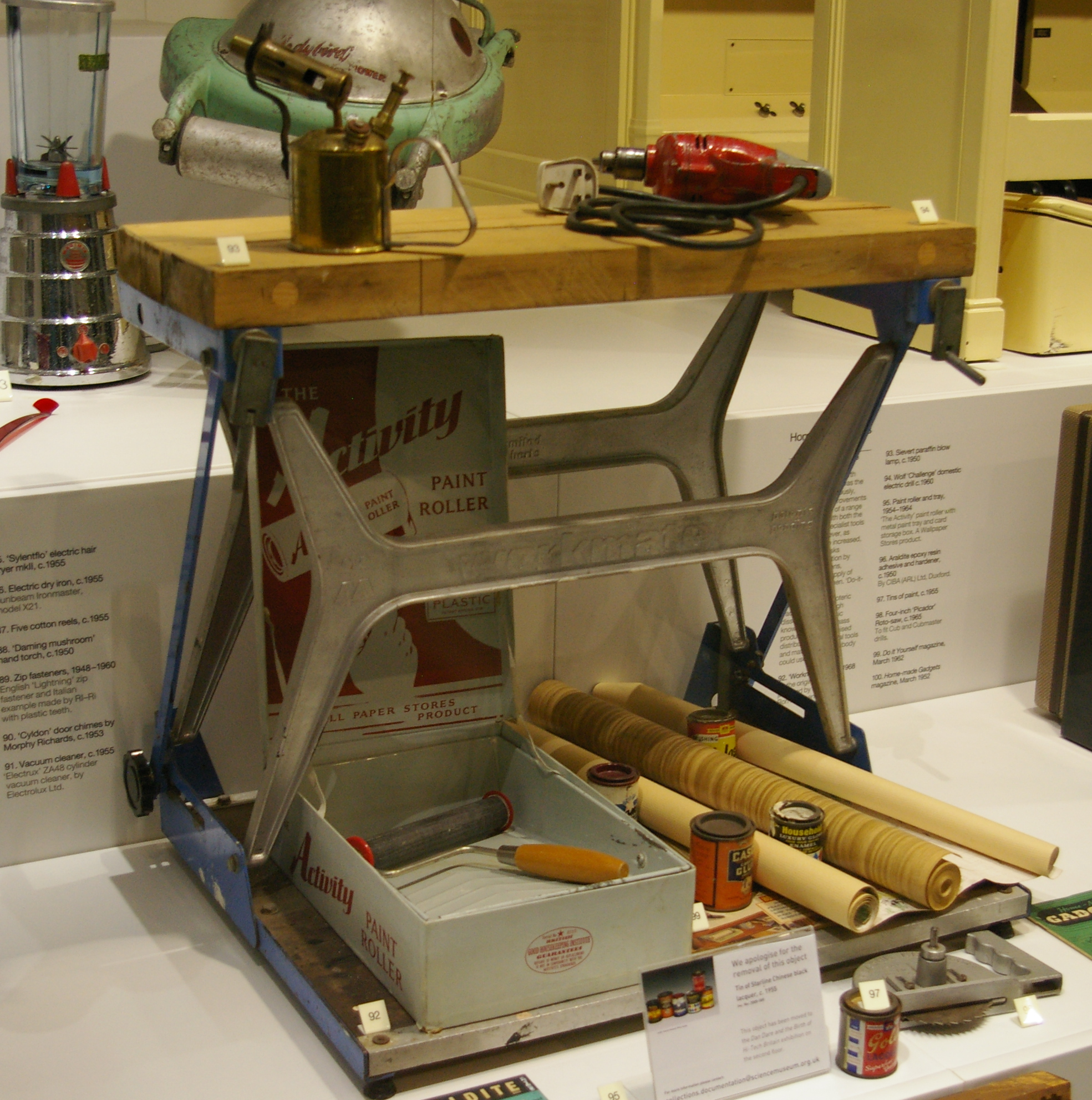
An early Workmate from c. 1969 at the Science Museum, London

The Black & Decker Workmate is a general purpose portable workbench and general carpentry tool manufactured under the brand Black & Decker.

== Description and usage ==
The workbench is a folding table for portability, but when unfolded stands about 3 feet (1 m) tall. The table top consists of two wooden jaws, one of which is fixed and the other moveable on threaded rods operated by handles. It can be used as a bench vice to hold wood, metal and other parts, either clamped between the jaws or, using supplied bench dogs, clamped on the table top. The jaws are wide enough to hold most bench top tools, such as a drill press, planer, miter saw, etc.

== History ==
The inventor Ron Hickman had difficulty convincing anyone to market the Workmate, and sold them himself at trade shows. He had his first breakthrough in 1968, after convincing a DIY magazine to let him exhibit at the Ideal Home Exhibition in London, which enabled him to sell 1,800 units that year.

After seeing some success in 1971, Black & Decker decided to work with Hickman to improve his initial design, and in 1972 Black & Decker's MKII version of the Workmate went into production. When released, it was sold in the United Kingdom for £24.95.

Black & Decker had trouble keeping up with demand for the Workmate in the UK, but was still unconvinced of how well the Workmate would be accepted in the United States. As a test of demand, the UK-manufactured Workmate WM325 was introduced to the United States market in 1974 as the Model 79-001 Type E ("E" for England). US consumers bought them up, and Black & Decker began building Workmates for the North American market at their factory in Brockville, Ontario, Canada.

The first Workmate produced in Canada and sold in the United States was designated the Model 79-001 Type 1. The 79-001 was produced until 1982, with frequent revisions, designated by Type numbers 2, 3, 4, 5, 6, 7, 8, and 9. Types E, and 1 through 5 used a pair of cast-aluminium pivoting H-frames to support the vice jaws and to allow the Workmate to fold for storage. The aluminum H-frame gave the Workmate a very distinctive appearance, and was considered to be "Hickman's greatest aesthetic stroke". By the Type 6, the aluminium H-frames were replaced by ones of stamped steel in a similar shape.

Black & Decker have sold 30 million Workmates as of 2011. Ron Hickman received a royalty of £1 for each Workmate sold, and became a wealthy man.
