= JavaTest harness =

jtreg
- Developer(s): Oracle Corporation
- Stable release: 4.1 / March 14, 2012
- Written in: Java
- Operating system: Cross-platform
- Platform: Java Virtual Machine
- License: GPL+linking exception
- Website: openjdk.java.net/jtreg/

The JavaTest harness (or jtreg) is a regression tests framework specifically designed by Sun Microsystems to test the reference Java platform implementation.

Although jtreg was originally designed to execute Technology Compatibility Kit (TCK) compliance tests, it is not designed to check compliance of a particular Java implementation to the specification, but to test any regressions' suite for the Java platform.

== History ==
jtreg started in 1997, during JDK 1.2 development. Being developed prior to JUnit existence, jtreg was initially not compatible with JUnit's test syntax, but later versions added a limited compatibility with JUnit.

== Use in OpenJDK ==
OpenJDK, the open-source implementation of the Java programming language encourages the use of jtreg tests for patch submissions.

== See also ==
- Technology Compatibility Kit
