= Welding table =

Fireproof table for welding

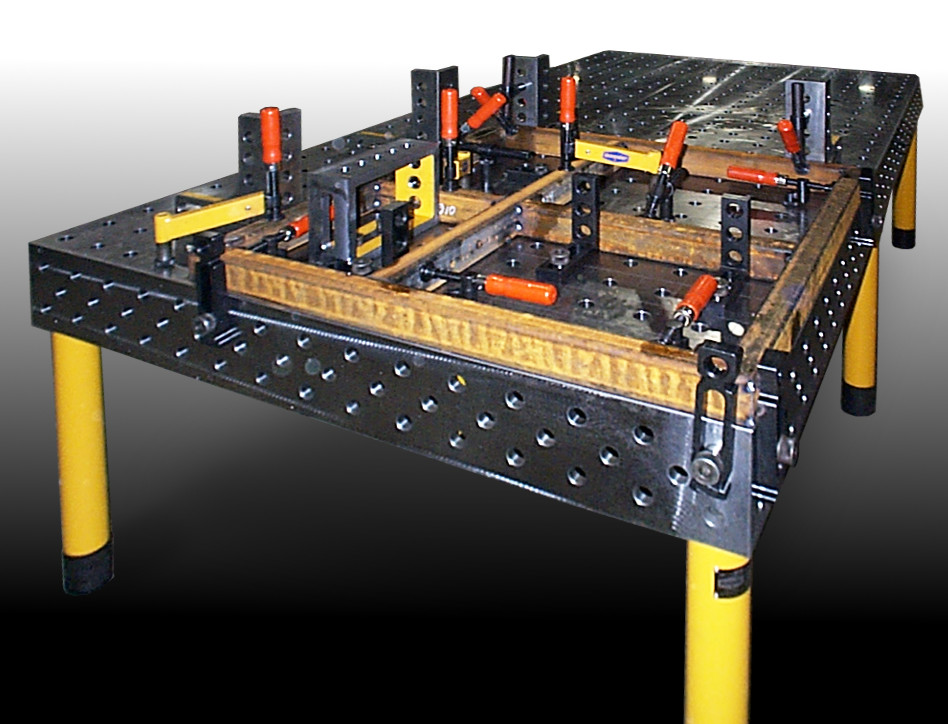
Welding table with holes for fixing workpieces to be welded with clamps

A welding table is a type of workbench used for holding workpieces during welding. They are made of fireproof and electrically conductive materials, and often have good possibilities for clamping workpieces down, providing increased stability, precision and security. In addition to a welding machine and personal protective equipment, they are often used together with accessories such as measuring tools, magnets and angles. Some welders build their own welding tables.

== Fire safety ==
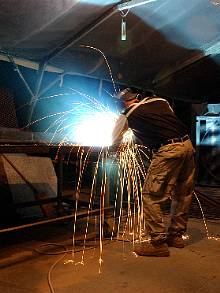
Hot slag falling to the ground during welding

They are often made of steel, and some welding tables have a zinc plating to prevent slag from sticking to the table. The table can withstand high temperatures and splashes of hot slag, unlike a wooden table which can catch fire more easily. This reduces the risk of risk of fire.

== Grounding ==
They are often connected to ground to prevent voltage leaks during work and to protect the welder from electrical shocks, but also to prevent radio noise from the welding process which otherwise can affect nearby electronics.

== Ergonomics ==
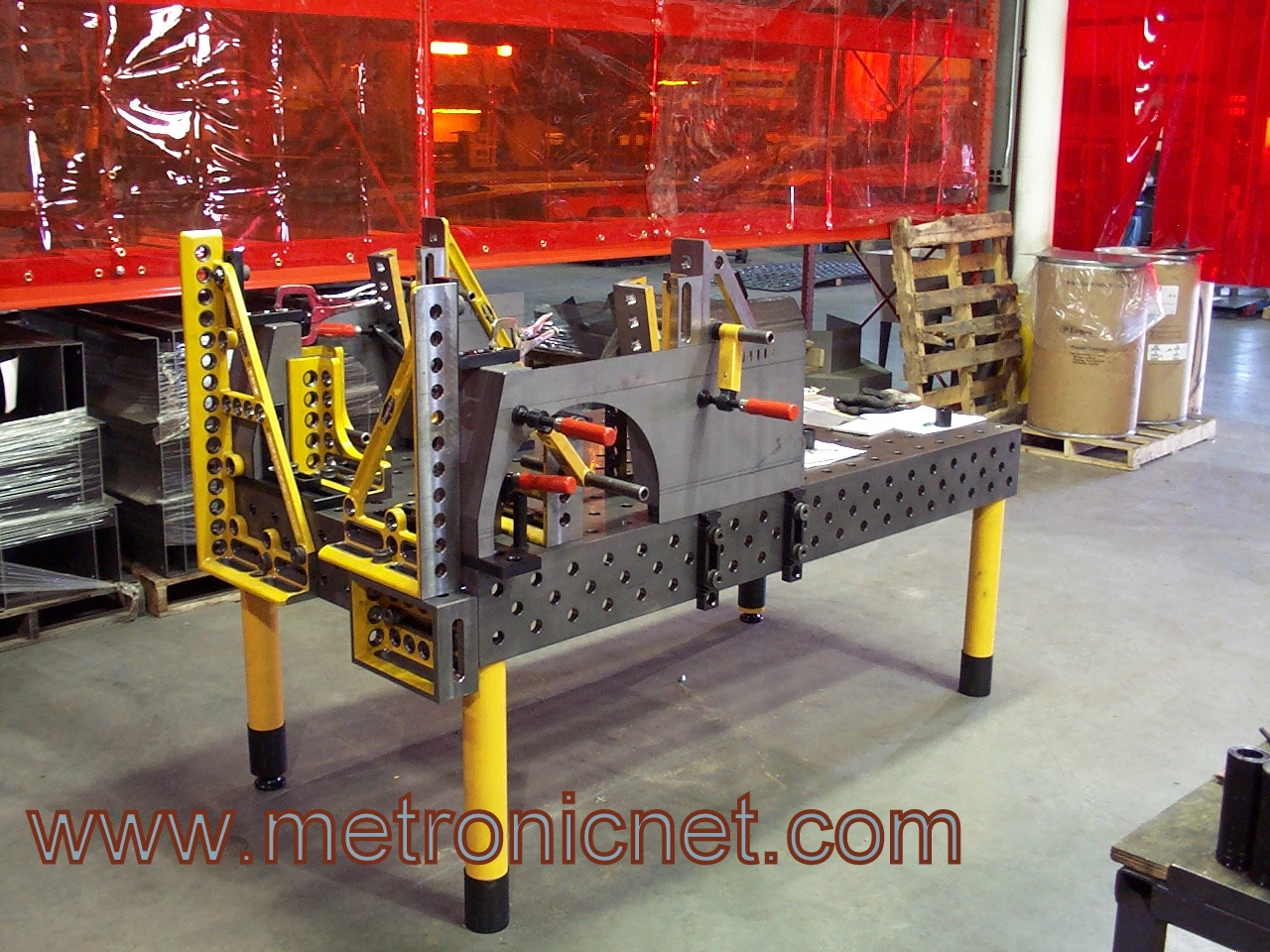
Welding table with modular tools

Most tables have an adjustable height so that the welder can sit or stand in a comfortable and ergonomic position.

Some also have the possibility for the work surface to be tilted or rotated so that the workpiece can get the desired position and orientation (pose).

== Mass, size and mobility ==
The space available and the size of the things to be welded will dictate the need. Some tables are very heavy and solid, and can withstand heavy workpieces, while other models are lighter and can only withstand lighter workpieces.

=== Stationary tables ===
Some tables are heavy, tough and stable, and are meant to be stationary in one place in a workshop, and are capable of withstanding loads from very heavy objects. A permanent welding table usually has a length of at least 2 meters.

=== Mobile tables ===
Some tables are portable so that they can be moved around the workshop as needed, for example in the form of mobile trolley tables with lockable wheels. There has been a trend with smaller tables that can be put together to form a longer work surface depending on the shape and size of what is to be welded, following a similar principle as a sawhorse. Some tables are extendable so that the size can be reduced or increased as necessary.

== See also ==
- Workbench (woodworking)
