= Java compiler =

Program compiler for Java programming language

A Java compiler is a compiler for the Java programming language.

Some Java compilers output optimized machine code for a particular hardware/operating system combination, called a domain specific computer system. An example would be the now discontinued GNU Compiler for Java.

The most common form of output from a Java compiler is Java class files containing cross-platform intermediate representation (IR), called Java bytecode.

The Java virtual machine (JVM) loads the class files and either interprets the bytecode or just-in-time compiles it to machine code and then possibly optimizes it using dynamic compilation.

A standard on how to interact with Java compilers was specified in JSR 199.

It is provided by module jdk.compiler, and requires the full Java Development Kit (as opposed to just the Java Runtime Environment), and reside in the javax.tools.* namespace.

== Example ==
package org.wikipedia.examples;

import java.io.IOException;
import java.io.File;

import javax.tools.JavaCompiler;
import javax.tools.ToolProvider;

public class Example {
    private final String TEST_FILE_NAME = "Test.java";

    public static void main(String[] args) throws IOException {
        File sourceFile = new File(TEST_FILE_NAME);
        if (!sourceFile.exists()) {
            throw new IllegalArgumentException(String.format("File path %s does not exist!", TIME_FILE_NAME));
        }
        JavaCompiler compiler = ToolProvider.getSystemJavaCompiler();

        if (compiler == null) {
            throw new RuntimeException("Compiler not available. Are you running on a JRE instead of a JDK?");
        }

        int result = compiler.run(null, null, null, sourceFile);

        System.out.printf("Compilation result: %s%n", result == 0 ? "Success" : "Failure");
    }
}

== See also ==
- List of Java Compilers
- javac, the standard Java compiler in Oracle's JDK
- Roslyn (compiler), compiler for C# also invokable programmatically
