= Javac =

Java compiler

javac
- Written in: Java
- Operating system: Cross-platform
- Type: Compiler
- License: GNU General Public License
- Website: www.oracle.com/technetwork/java/javase/downloads/index.html

javac (pronounced "java-see") is the primary Java compiler included in the Java Development Kit (JDK) from Oracle Corporation. Martin Odersky implemented the GJ compiler, and his implementation became the basis for javac.

The compiler accepts source code conforming to the Java language specification (JLS) and produces Java bytecode conforming to the Java Virtual Machine Specification (JVMS).

javac is itself written in Java. The compiler can also be invoked programmatically.

== History ==
On 13 November 2006, Sun's HotSpot Java virtual machine (JVM) and Java Development Kit (JDK) were made available under the GPL license.

Since version 0.95, GNU Classpath, a free implementation of the Java Class Library, supports compiling and running javac using the Classpath runtime — GNU Interpreter for Java (GIJ) — and compiler — GNU Compiler for Java (GCJ) — and also allows one to compile the GNU Classpath class library, tools and examples with javac itself.

== See also ==
- Java compiler – for a general presentation of Java compilers, and a list of other existing alternative compilers.
- Java Platform
- OpenJDK
