= CrossFTP =

FTP client software

- Developer: CrossFTP.com
- Stable release: 1.99.9 / November 11, 2021; 4 years ago
- Operating system: Cross-platform
- Type: FTP client
- License: Proprietary, freeware
- Website: http://www.crossftp.com/

CrossFTP is a free FTP, Amazon S3, Amazon Glacier, Google Storage, and Microsoft Azure storage client for Win, Mac, and Linux. CrossFTP adopts traditional FTP client GUI with local files displayed on the left, remote files on the right. CrossFTP Pro further includes SFTP, FTPS, and WebDav support, and features scheduling and directory synchronization.

== Licensing ==
CrossFTP is free for personal, educational, non-profit, and business use. CrossFTP Pro requires a license fee and provides more advanced features, such as data sync, multi-thread support, etc.

== Reviews and references ==
- Softpedia.com – Reviews – "It's a reliable app, the kind that extensively helps your work!" – By: Mihai Mircea, Editor, Software Reviews
- Dreamhost – Powerful FTP client
- PC Magazine – one of the Best Free Software of 2009 – File Transfer/Download - CrossFTP
