= Workbench =

Table designed for manual work

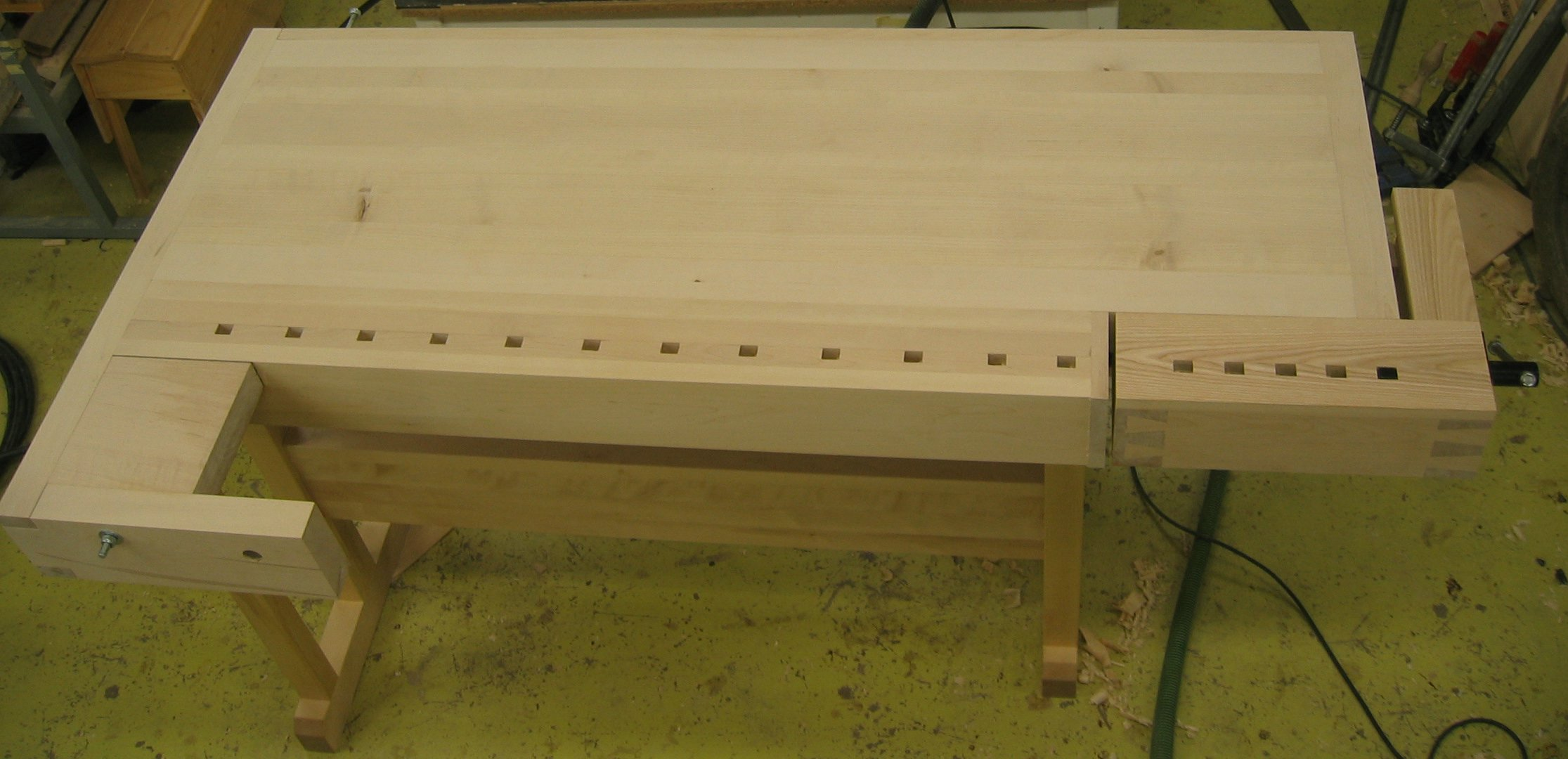
European style woodworking workbench In most instances the "end caps" and the "shoulder vise arm" are significantly thicker than is shown above. Indeed, this shoulder vice and its "arm" appear to be incomplete.

A workbench is a sturdy table at which manual work is done. They range from simple flat surfaces to very complex designs that may be considered tools in themselves. Workbenches vary in size from tiny jewellers benches to the huge benches used by staircase makers. Almost all workbenches are rectangular in shape, often using the surface, corners and edges as flat/square and dimension standards. Design is as varied as the type of work for which the benches are used but most share these attributes:

- A comfortable height for working with provisions for seated or standing work
- A way to fix the workpiece to the surface so that it may be worked with both hands
- Provisions for mounting, storing and accessing tools

Workbenches are made from many different materials including metal, wood, stone, and composites depending on the needs of the work.

== Types ==
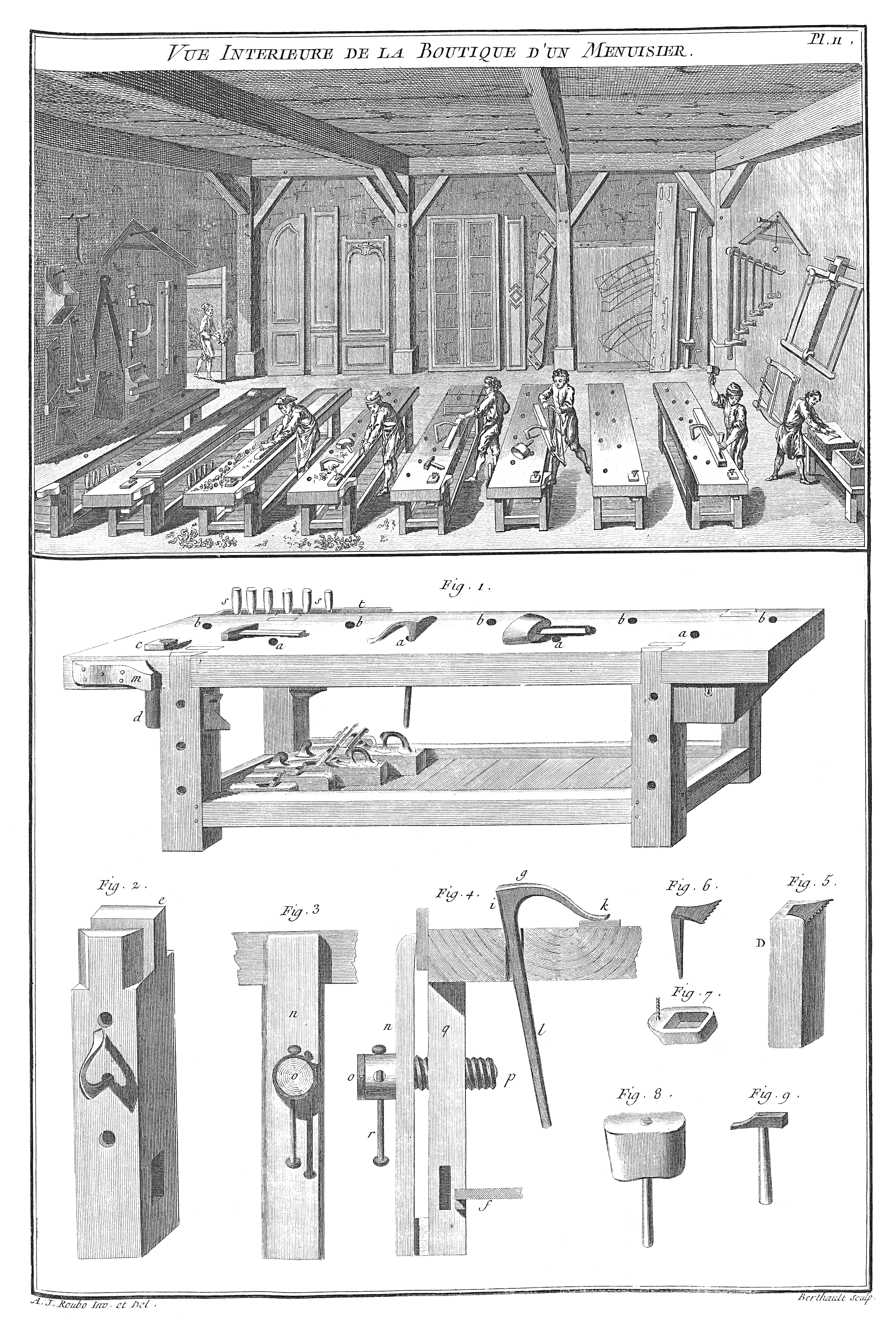
Original Roubo workbench plans, 1769

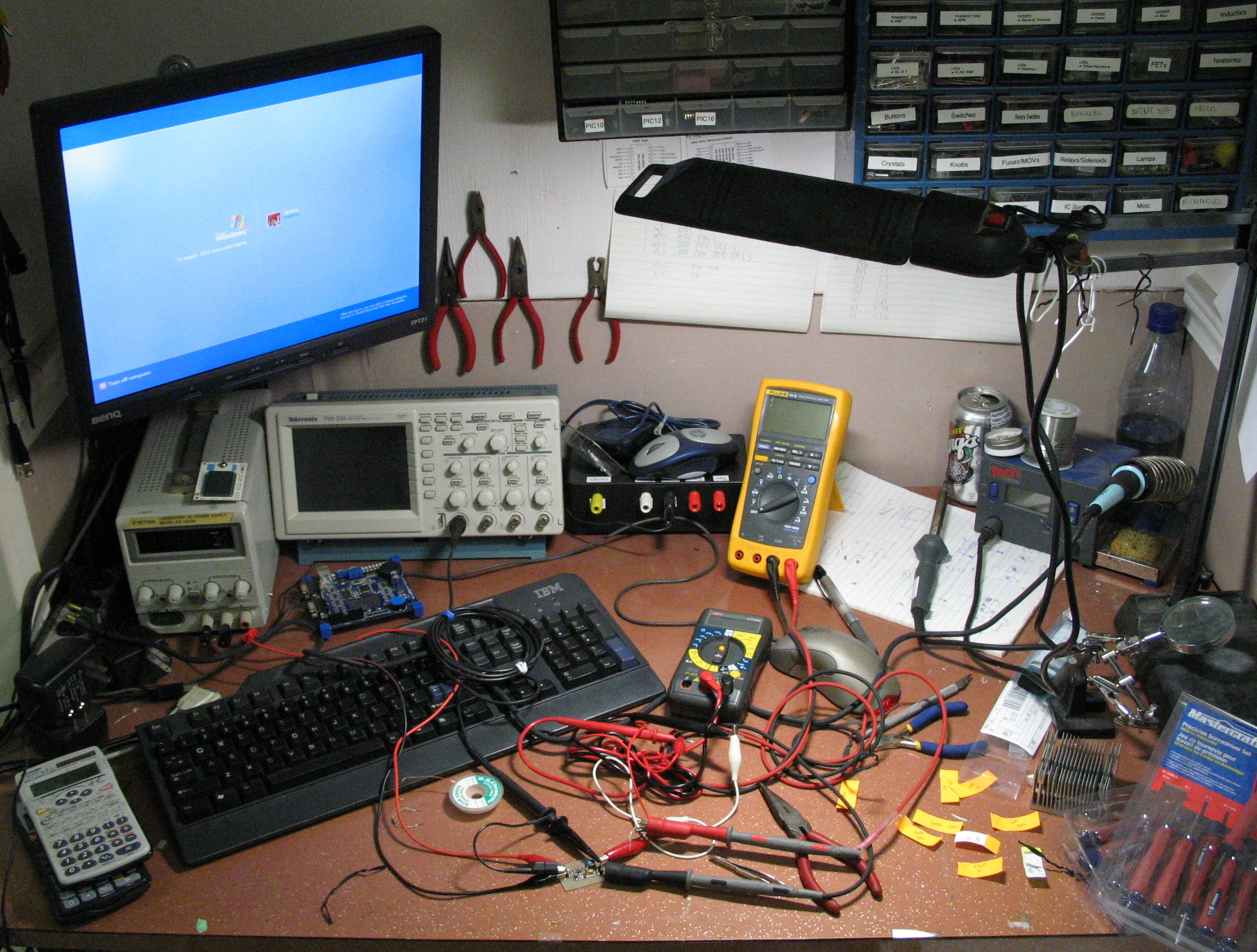
The workbench of a hobby electronics enthusiast with an oscilloscope, PC, two digital multimeters, soldering station, pocket calculator, small tools, a stabilized power supply unit and storage boxes on the wall for electronic components

Workbench types may be divided according to the particular work they are designed to accommodate:

Multi-purpose/portable
These benches are small, light, collapsible, and typically have built in clamps. Epitomized by the Black & Decker Workmate, a bench invented and patented by Ron Hickman, they can be used for a wide range of manual work.
Woodworking
May be used for general woodworking but may be specialized for joinery, cabinetmaking, patternmaking, stairbuilding, carving, carpentry or trim work. They are usually made from solid wood and have integral clamping mechanisms.
Metalworking (e.g. welding table)
Metalworkers need benches built to handle grinding, welding, light casting and forging, and layout. Most of these benches include a metalworker's vise mounted to the top.
Gardening
Gardener's benches must be resistant to moisture and dirt. They are used for potting, seeding, and grooming, and usually have built-in shelving and storage.
Electronics
Formerly a fixture in radio shacks, now used for assembly and repair of all sorts of electronic equipment including communication, computer, and home entertainment items. These benches usually have sources of power built in, along with shelves and task lighting. The height of most electronics benches are set for a seated worker and are equipped with electrically dissipative materials for electrostatic discharge (ESD) protection.
Software
Software used the metaphor of a workbench for exposing file management and application launching functionality, like in the AmigaOS workbench, or for designing processes connecting data sources to operations and models.
Industrial
These workbenches offer the benefits of traditional workbenches but on a stronger and larger scale. They're built to withstand heavy-duty projects and made with materials like steel that are designed for such purposes.
General repair
Almost all family farms have one of these. Also found in small engine repair shops. Used for sharpening, cleaning, lubricating, assembly/disassembly, and light metal work.
Laboratory work
Utilized, especially with the chemical and biological sciences. Surfaces are typically made of chemical resistant materials such as epoxy resin, phenolic resin, high-density polyethene, and stainless steel. Some of these benches have integrated services like water, gas, and power, built in or near at hand.
Art and sculpture
These benches are most likely to be used in the round. They are designed so that the workpiece can be mounted firmly, usually from underneath, and accessed from all sides. Used by wood and stone carvers.
Jewelers and watchmakers
Purpose-built benches which generally have a "bench pin" – a small wooden work surface protruding out towards the worker, allowing for working on small parts. In addition, there is usually a tray or leather apron underneath to catch precious metal filings or dropped items. They are designed so that when the worker is seated the work is at or near eye level.
Fitting and assembling
Used by machinists, pipefitters, electricians, textile workers, handloaders, and piece workers, these benches usually have space for layout and built-in tools, jigs and measuring devices to facilitate the work.

== Workbench surfaces ==
The workbench surface is a vital part of the workbench. Workbench surface can be mainly divided as 4 types. They are:

- Particleboard: Tiny wood particles that are glued and pressure-bonded together. Most of the tops are also coated with melamine or laminate making them easy to wipe clean.
- Wood: Typically built of thick and solid maple.
- Plastic or laminate
- Steel

== See also ==
- Backsplash (interior), protection for walls above a work surface where splashes may occur, like kitchens or bathrooms
