= Wall panel =

Rigid material used as wall covering

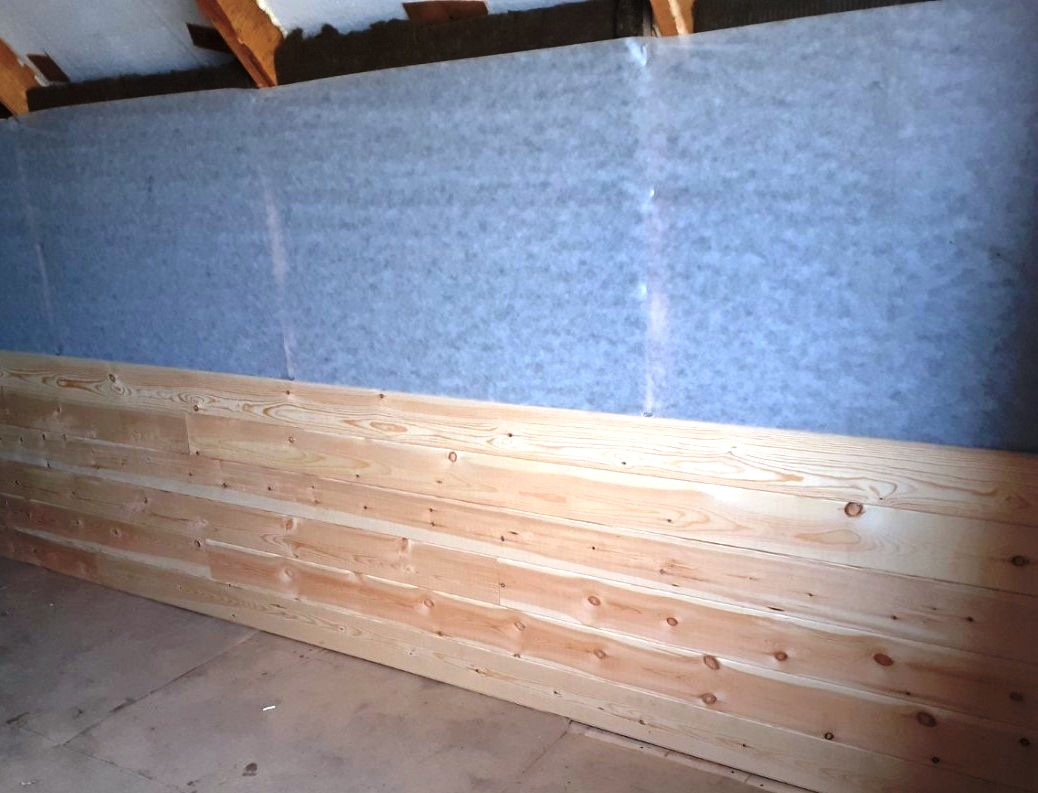
Covering the inner wall of an attic

A wall panel is single piece of material, usually flat and cut into a rectangular shape, that serves as the visible and exposed covering for a wall. Wall panels provide insulation, soundproofing, uniformity of appearance, and are easily replaceable.

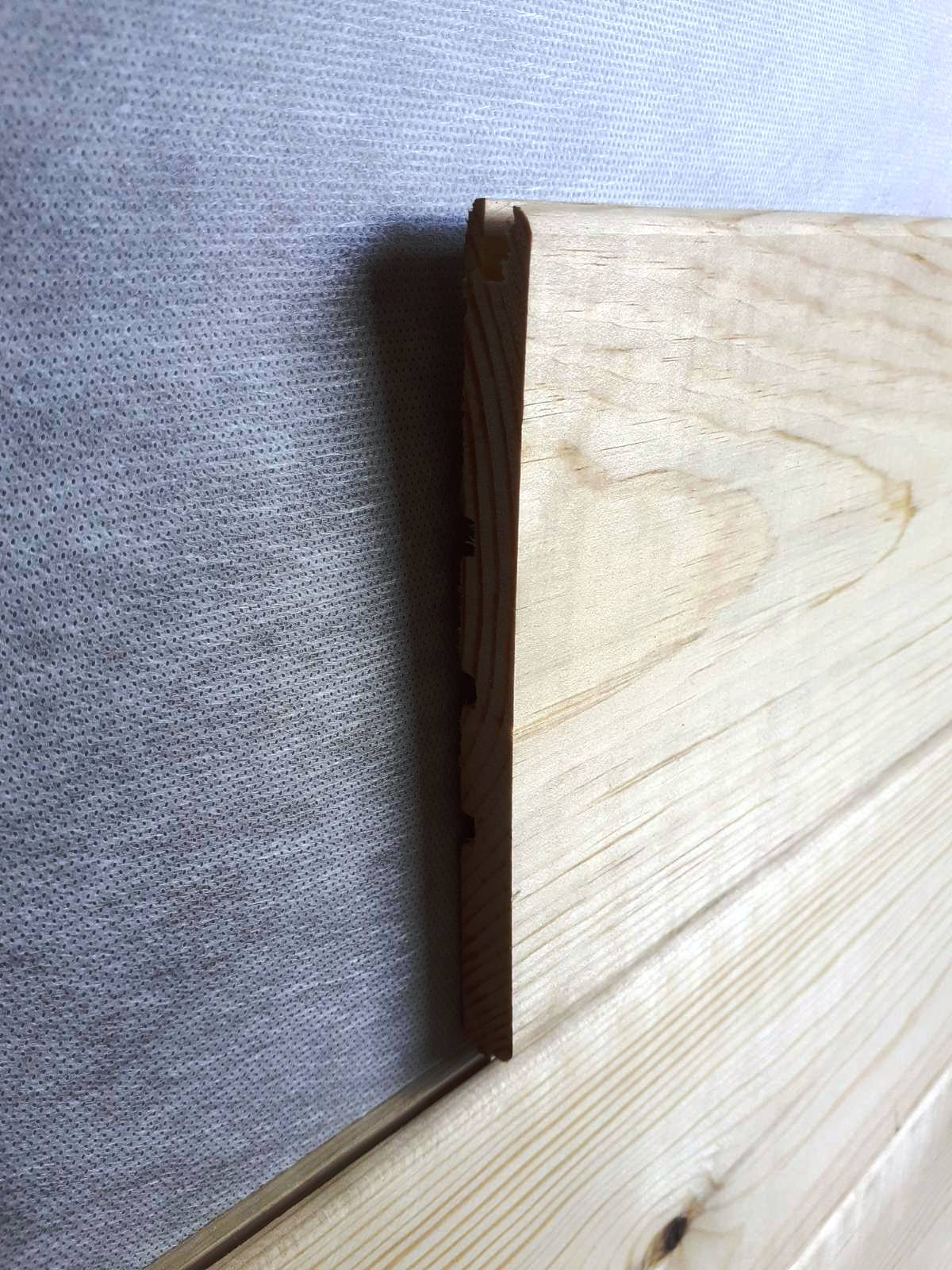
End view of wall panel showing tongue (top) and groove (bottom) joining method

== Biodegradeable wall panels ==
Eco friendly wall panels can be made out of the fibrous residue of sugarcane (bagasse). The raw material used for these wall panels is 100% recycled, and 100% biodegradable.

== See also ==
- Acoustic panel – Sound-absorbing board
- Siding (construction)
