= Ron Hickman =

South African inventor and automobile designer (1932–2011)

Ronald Price Hickman
- Born: 21 October 1932. Greytown, KwaZulu - Natal, South Africa
- Died: 17 February 2011 (aged 78); St Lawrence, Jersey
- Occupations: Inventor, automobile designer
- Known for: Lotus Elan, Lotus Europa, B&D Workmate

Ronald Price Hickman OBE (1932–2011) was a South African-born, Jersey-based automobile designer and inventor. He worked for both the Ford motor company and Lotus, where he designed the original Lotus Elan, the Lotus Elan +2 and the Lotus Europa. Outside the circle of automobile enthusiasts he is best known for his design of a wood-working bench called the Black & Decker Workmate.

== Automobile design ==
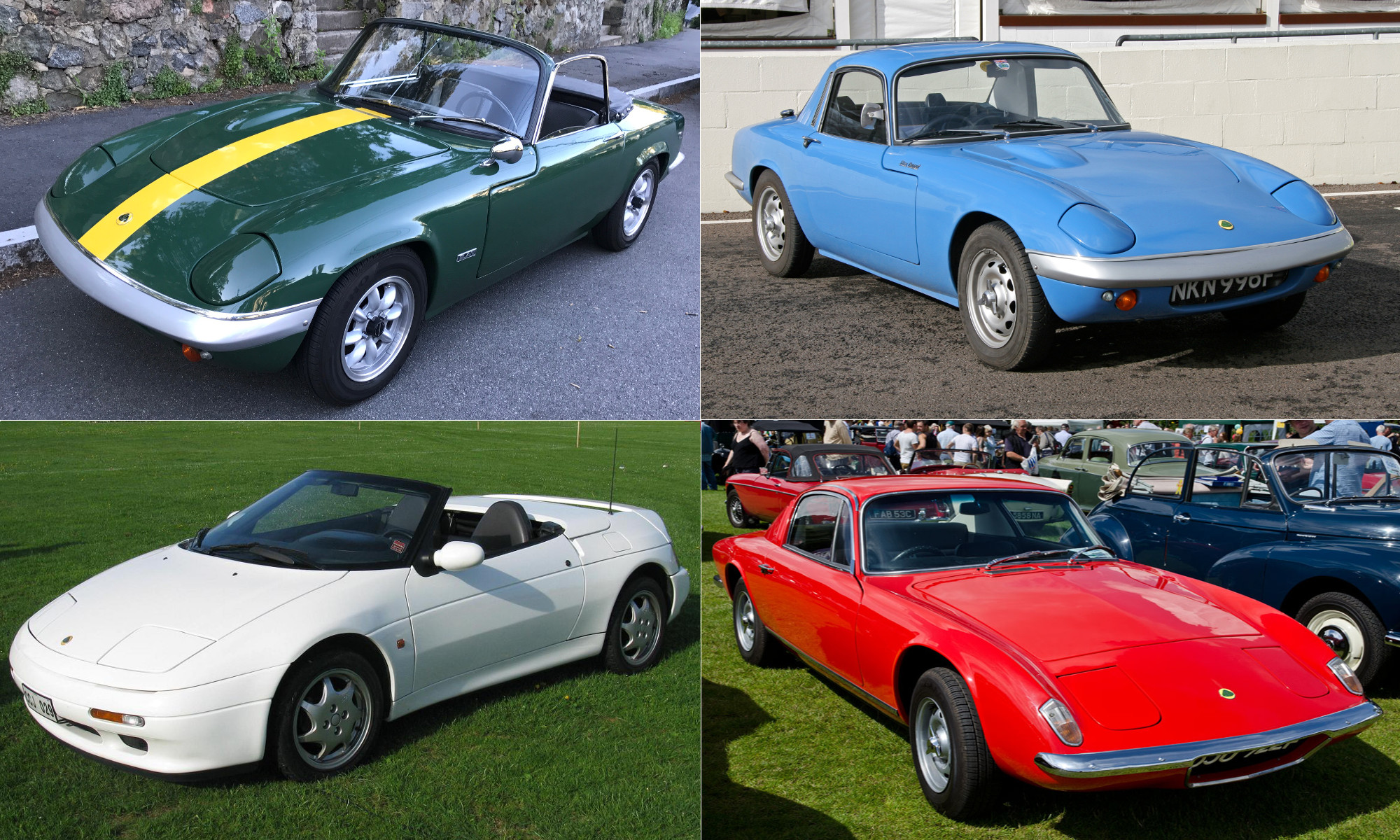
Four Lotus Elans: Elan S3, Elan S4, M100 Elan, Elan +2

In 1954 on arrival in London from South Africa, he was initially employed by a music publisher, but quickly found work at the Ford Motor Company at Dagenham first as a clay modeller and later he helped to style the 105E Ford Anglia.

He met Colin Chapman, the famous engineer and founder of Lotus Cars, at a motor show in Earls Court. After three years at Ford, Hickman moved to Chapman's newly founded company in north London and worked as a production engineer and general manager. He worked on the first car produced by Lotus, the Elite, which was deemed beautifully styled and a superb drive, but proved too complicated to build and too frail to be desirable by the public.

Hickman worked with John Frayling to head the team that designed the Elan, which came into production in 1962. He also designed the first Lotus Europa as part of Lotus's GT40 project bid.

He left Lotus in 1967 and moved to Hoddesdon, Hertfordshire, where he worked for Cunard on prototypes for the seating in the QE2 and on his own invention, the Workmate.

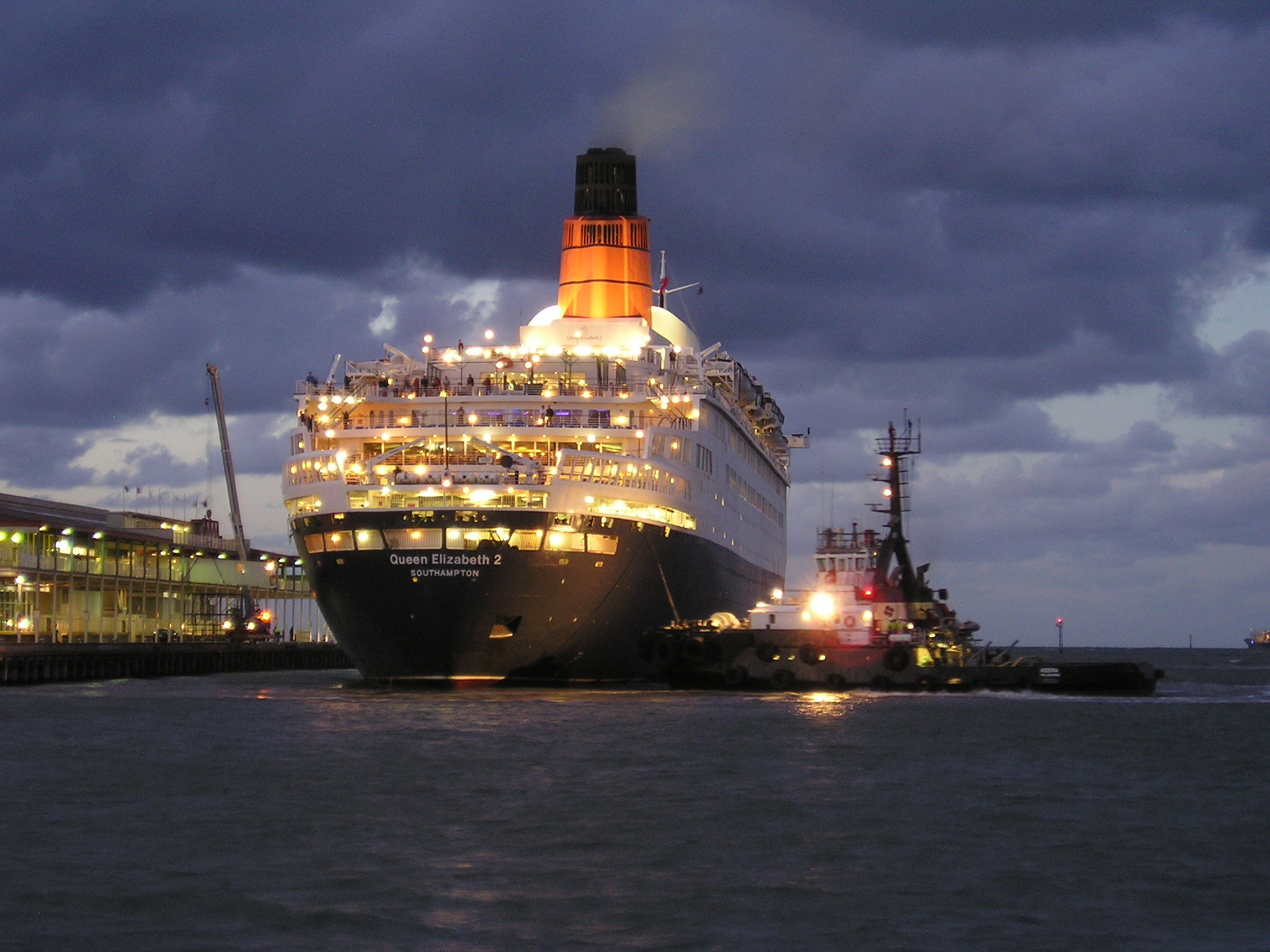
QE2 berthing at Station Pier, Port Melbourne

== The Workmate ==
Hickman's inspiration for the Workmate came in 1961: While building a wardrobe, he used an expensive Swedish chair as a sawhorse and inadvertently cut its leg off. His wife was not impressed and Hickman came up with a simple, multifunctional bench; a combination sawhorse and vice on a foldable aluminium frame. It allowed the average DIYer, without ready access to a full woodworking shop, to saw through timber without improvising using the edges of chairs or tables. He then set up his own design company, Mate Tools, above a barn in Hoddesdon, Hertfordshire, and continued to refine his Workmate design.

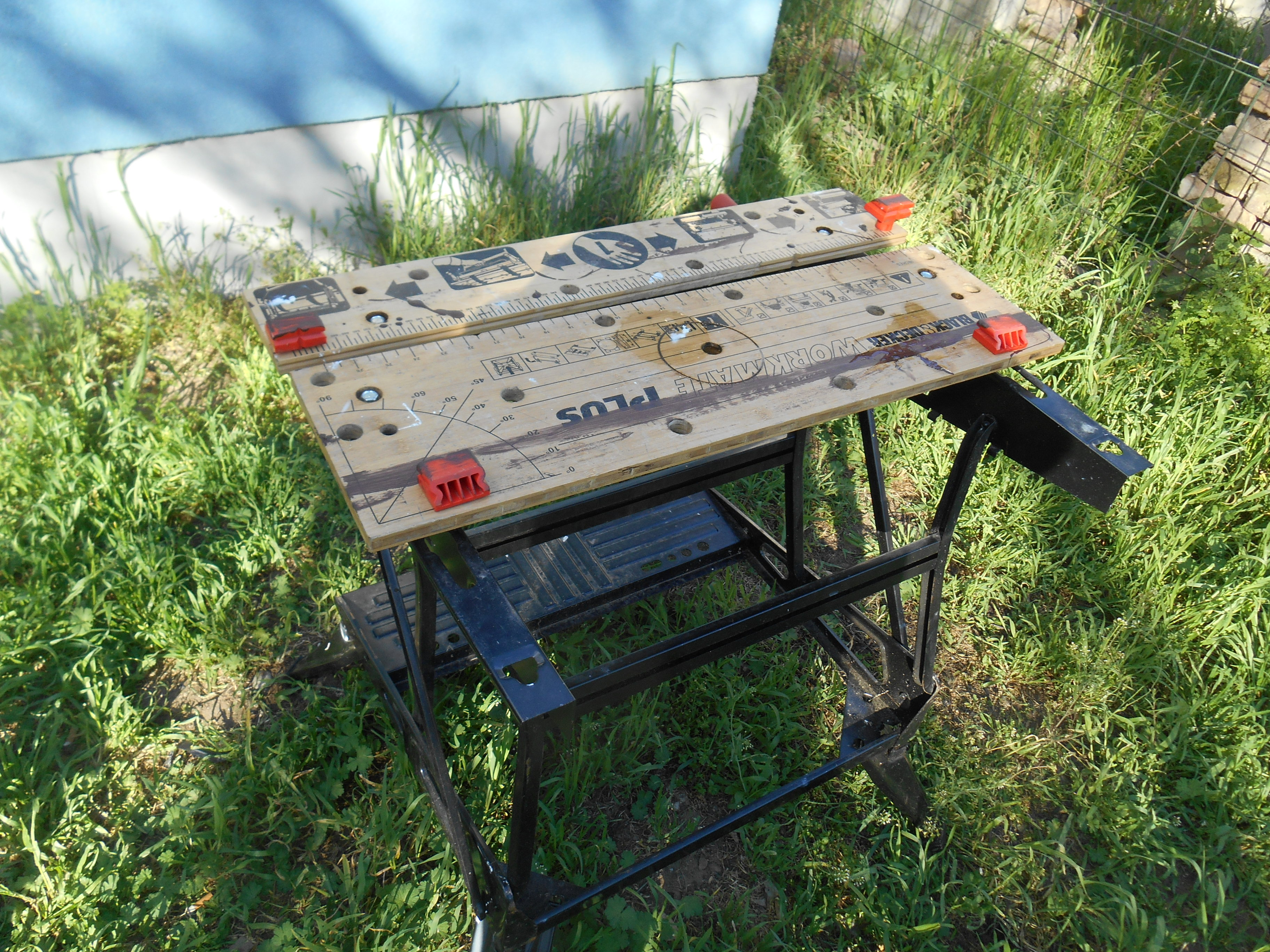
A "Workmate Plus", scored with a holesaw and licked with paint, as part of general DIY

His offer to license the product he developed was rejected by several companies, including Stanley Works who could not see a large market for it. Hickman sold the benches himself to professional builders at trade shows until Black & Decker saw their value in 1973 and began producing them. Hickman received a 3% royalty on the sales of the WorkMate. By 1981 it had sold 10 million benches and by 2011 more than 100 million. Hickman had to defend his patent numerous times against manufacturers attempting to copy it.

== Villa Devereux ==
Hickman moved to Jersey in 1977, where he designed and built his eccentric home Villa Devereux. The building was inspired by houses he had seen in California, but using materials available to Jersey: slate roofing and textured granite walls. The interior of the home was described as "eclectic" and "70s flavoured". It included a perspex chandelier and an indoor swimming pool surrounded by palm-frond wallpaper. The living room had chairs made of twisted branches designed by John Makepeace.

Hickman's inventions were also part of the house. Carpeted stairs in the living room rearranged to form a ramp allowing a trolley to be wheeled onto the patio. The house had an information panel which showed which doors or windows were open and the temperature of each room.

In one of the upstairs rooms Hickman kept a group of ancient-looking Workmate prototypes, along with the Swedish chair that had been his inspiration in designing the Workmate.

== Other Patents ==
Hickman had several other patents filed including:

- a remotely positionable mirror on an elongate arm (patent 4039818, August 2, 1977);
- a foldable ladder (patent 4016954 April 12, 1977);
- a drill guide (patent D243505 March 1, 1977); and
- an extension arm for a vice (patent D243820 March 29, 1977).

He also designed a hand wringer for clothing that could attach to any flat surface and a child's toilet pot that resisted being knocked over.

== Personal life ==
Hickman was born on 21 October 1932 in Greytown, Natal, South Africa to Cyril Price Hickman (a bookkeeper) and Helena Alberta Hickman. After leaving high school he worked as a courthouse clerk in Pietermaritzburg while studying law for six years. He was obsessed with cars and on completing his legal training in 1954, he borrowed £100 from his father and travelled to London with the intention of finding work in the motor vehicle industry.

He worked for Ford and Lotus but it was his own invention, the Workmate, which allowed him to retire a rich man from the royalties paid by Black & Decker on the sales of the device.

Former racing driver Derek Warwick (1990 Formula One, Team Lotus) said that Hickman was a unique character with a distinctly inventive spirit. "He came to my offices a few times with new designs and they always intrigued me", he said. "He always thought of clever ways of doing things. Whatever he saw, whatever he touched, he wanted to reinvent it. That was his mind." Warwick added that Hickman was "a little bit off the wall, a little bit eccentric, a little bit wacky". "He was one of these 'crazy scientists' types. They are not like the norm; they are just different people. You don't design the Elan or the Black & Decker [Workmate] unless you are a very clever man."

In 1977 he moved to Saint Brélade, Jersey, where he had a design factory and belonged to the Jersey Old Motor Club. He never lost his love of cars and his collection included an Elan Sprint and a Cadillac V-16.

Hickman retired in 1982 and in 1994, he was appointed OBE for services to industrial innovation.

He died at the age of 78 in hospital on the island after a five-month-long illness caused by a serious fall.

After his death, more than 100 automotive sketches and concept drawings, including supporting photographs and documents were donated to the National Motor Museum Trust at Beaulieu by Hickman's widow, Helen.
