= Oracle TopLink =

Java mapping and persistence framework

- Developer: Oracle Corporation
- Stable release: Oracle TopLink 12c (12.1.3)
- Written in: Java
- Operating system: Cross-platform
- Platform: Java Virtual Machine
- License: Oracle License
- Website: www.oracle.com/technetwork/middleware/toplink/overview/index.html

Oracle TopLink is a mapping and persistence framework for Java developers. TopLink is produced by Oracle and is a part of Oracle's OracleAS, WebLogic, and OC4J servers. It is an object-persistence and object-transformation framework. TopLink provides development tools and run-time functionalities that ease the development process and help increase functionality. Persistent object-oriented data is stored in relational databases which helps build high-performance applications. Storing data in either XML (Extensible Markup Language) or relational databases is made possible by transforming it from object-oriented data.

A user-interface is possible on TopLink with the help of TopLink Mapping Workbench. This Mapping Workbench makes it possible to carry out the following.

- Graphical mapping of an object model to data model.
- Generation of data model from its object model and vice versa.
- Auto-mapping of any existing data models and object models.

Oracle's JDeveloper IDE provides easy integration of these functionalities provided by the Mapping Workbench.

With the use of TopLink, users can stay more focused on their primary cause and let TopLink handle the integration of persistence and object transformation into their application. Designing, implementing and deploying process is accelerated as TopLink supports a variety of data sources and formats such as Relational database, Object-relational database, Enterprise information system (EIS), XML and many others.

== History ==
Toplink was originally developed by The Object People in Smalltalk. It was ported to Java in 1996-1998 and called "TopLink for Java". In 2002, TopLink was acquired by Oracle Corporation and was developed under the Oracle Fusion Middleware product. The TopLink code was donated to the Eclipse Foundation and the EclipseLink project was born in 2007. The EclipseLink now provides the functionality of TopLink. Sun Microsystems selected EclipseLink in March 2008, as the implementation for the JPA 2.0, JSR 317 reference. A number of versions of TopLink have been released since and the latest version 12c (12.1.3) is available for free Download.

== Key Features ==
- Rapidly build high-performance enterprise applications that are scalable and maintainable.
- Extensive mapping support using relational, object-relational data type and XML.
- Advanced query capability including native SQL, Java Persistence Query Language (JPQL) and EclipseLink Expressions framework.
- RESTful Services
- Just-in-time reading.
- Tenant Isolation
- NoSQL
- Various Optimistic and pessimistic locking policies and options.
- JSON
- Integration with commonly used application servers and databases.
- External Metadata Sources
- TopLink Grid.

== Key Components ==
=== EclipseLink Core and API ===
The runtime component of TopLink is provided by the EclipseLink Core. This API provides direct access to the runtime, which is embedded into the application. Persistence behavior is enabled by making application calls that invoke EclipseLink API to perform these functionalities which provides safe access to shared databases.

Import the following class to use extended functionality of EclipseLink.

import org.eclipse.persistence.*

=== Object-Relational(JPA 2.0) Component ===
The binding of Java classes to XML schemas is possible with the help of Object-XML, which is an EclipseLink component. By implementing JAXB, mapping information is provided through annotations. It also provides manipulation of XML.

=== SDO Component ===
The Service Data Objects (SDO) provides with the use of SDO API, use dynamic objects to customize and manipulate XML, use of static data objects and conversion of XML Schema.

=== Database Web Services Component ===
Database Web Services (DBWS) facilitates access to relational databases with the help of web service. A database access can be made without the need to write a Java code. The XML SOAP Messages and the databases are connected by the runtime component of DBWS which uses EclipseLink.

=== TopLink Grid ===
TopLink Grid is an integration mechanism that provides connection between Oracle Coherence and EclipseLink. An application generally interacts with the relational database, which is its primary database. But with TopLink the application can store data on the Coherence grid called as JPA on the grid.

TopLink Grid functionality can be used only if the user has license for Oracle Coherence. This functionality is provided by:

toplink-grid.jar

To get support for TopLink Grid and EclipseLink, users also need to import the following package of classes.

org.eclipse.coherence.*

== TopLink Operations (Insert, Update, Delete) ==
Database operations like Insert, Update and Delete can also be performed in TopLink. The changes made to the database are reflected in the Oracle Coherence cache. In Java Persistence API, an entity is a persistence class. Using TopLink, a number of performance features for writing large amounts of data can be implemented. Batch writing, stored procedure support, parameter binding, statement ordering and other features are offered to satisfy database constraints.

The basic operations are

=== Insert ===
The EntityManager method persist(Object entity) is used to add an instance and marks it for insertion into the database.

entityManager.getTransaction().begin(); 
Employee newEmployee = new Employee(5); 
entityManager.persist(newEmployee); 
entityManager.getTransaction().commit();

On completion of the transaction, the newEmployee data will be inserted into the database.

=== Update ===
Updating an entity means simply reading the transaction and updating the properties of this entity. Updating the Employee LastName can be done as follows.

entityManager.getTransaction().begin(); 
Employee existingEmployee = entityManager.find(Employee.class, 5); 
existingEmployee.setLastName("NewLastName"); 
entityManager.getTransaction().commit();

=== Delete ===
Deleting an entity is the opposite of Insertion and can be one using remove(Object entity) method of the EntityManager.

entityManager.getTransaction().begin(); 
Employee existingEmployee = entityManager.find(Employee.class, 5); 
entityManager.remove(existingEmployee); 
entityManager.getTransaction().commit();

The EntityManager method flush() deletes the entity on completion of the transaction.

== Development Tools ==
Users can use most of the tools in the market and use TopLink along with it. But the following toots provide special integration with TopLink.

- Oracle JDeveloper
- Oracle Enterprise Pack for Eclipse
- Eclipse
- NetBeans

== Supported Database Platforms ==
Database	Java Class
Apache Derby	org.eclipse.persistence.platform.database.DerbyPlatform
Attunity	org.eclipse.persistence.platform.database.AttunityPlatform
dBASE	org.eclipse.persistence.platform.database.DBasePlatform
Firebird	org.eclipse.persistence.platform.database.FirebirdPlatform
H2	org.eclipse.persistence.platform.database.H2Platform
HyperSQLDatabase(HSQL)	org.eclipse.persistence.platform.database.HSQLPlatform
IBM Cloudscape	org.eclipse.persistence.platform.database.CloudscapePlatform
IBM Db2	org.eclipse.persistence.platform.database.DB2MainframePlatform
Microsoft Access	org.eclipse.persistence.platform.database.AccessPlatformPlatform
Microsoft SQLServer	org.eclipse.persistence.platform.database.SQLServerPlatform
MySQL	org.eclipse.persistence.platform.database.MySQLPlatform

== See also ==
- EclipseLink
- Hibernate (framework)
- Apache Cayenne
- IBATIS
