= Apache OJB =

Java software tool

Apache ObJectRelationalBridge
- Developer: Apache Software Foundation
- Stable release: 1.0.55 / December 31, 2005; 20 years ago
- Written in: Java
- Operating system: Cross-platform
- Type: Object-relational mapping
- License: Apache License 2.0
- Website: db.apache.org/ojb/

Apache ObJectRelationalBridge (OJB) is an Object/Relational mapping tool that allows transparent persistence for Java Objects against relational databases. It was released on April 6, 2005.

As of January 16, 2011 Apache ObJectRelationalBridge has been retired.

== Features ==
OJB is an open source project. It is lightweight and easy to use, requiring simply configure two files to implement a persistence layer. It is easy to integrate into an existing application because it does not generate code. It allows the use of different patterns of persistence: owner (PersistenceBroker API), JDO and Object Data Management Group (ODMG).

== Functionality ==
OJB uses an XML based Object/Relational mapping. The mapping resides in a dynamic MetaData layer, which can be manipulated at runtime through a simple Meta-Object-Protocol (MOP) to change the behaviour of the persistence kernel.

== Configuration ==
At least two files are required to configure OJB: OJB.properties and repository.xml

== Allocation ==
For mapping a 1-1 relationship, for example, you have two tables: person and account. In this case, a person has an account and vice versa.

== See also ==
- Apache OpenJPA
