= DataNucleus =

Open-source Java library

- Developer(s): DataNucleus Team
- Initial release: April 25, 2008; 16 years ago
- Stable release: 6.0.7 / February 3, 2024; 13 months ago
- Written in: Java
- Platform: Java SE, Java EE
- Type: Object-relational mapping
- License: Apache License 2
- Website: www.datanucleus.org

DataNucleus (formerly known as Java Persistent Objects JPOX) is an open source project (under the Apache 2 license) which provides software products around data management in Java. The DataNucleus project started in 2008 (the JPOX project started in 2003 and was relaunched as DataNucleus in 2008 with broader scope).

DataNucleus Access Platform is a fully compliant implementation of the Java Data Objects (JDO) 1.0, 2.0, 2.1, 2.2, 3.0, 3.1, 3.2 specifications (JSR 0012, JSR 0243) and the Java Persistence API (JPA) 1.0, 2.0, 2.1, 2.2 specifications (JSR 0220, JSR 0317, JSR 0338), providing transparent persistence of Java objects. It supports persistence to the widest range of datastores of any Java persistence software, supporting all of the main object-relational mapping (ORM) patterns, allows querying using either JDOQL, JPQL or SQL, and comes with its own byte-code enhancer. It allows persistence to relational datastores (RDBMS), object-based datastores (db4o, NeoDatis ODB), document-based storage (XML, Excel, OpenDocument spreadsheets), web-based storage (JSON, Google Storage, Amazon Simple Storage Service), map-based datastores (HBase, Google's Bigtable, Apache Cassandra), graph-based datastores (Neo4j), document stores (MongoDB) as well as other types of datastores (e.g. LDAP). Its plugins are OSGi-compliant so can be used equally in an OSGi environment.

DataNucleus Access Platform is also utilised by the persistence layer behind Google App Engine for Java, and VMForce (cloud offering from Salesforce.com and VMWare).

== See also ==
- Apache Isis, Domain driven applications, quickly. Using DataNucleus JDO for persistence
- Apache Hive, Data warehouse infrastructure using DataNucleus for persistence
- JFire, ERP using DataNucleus for persistence
