= Oracle Coherence =

Oracle Coherence (originally Tangosol Coherence) is a Java-based distributed cache and in-memory data grid developed by Oracle Corporation. It is claimed to be intended for systems that require high availability, high scalability and low latency, particularly in cases when traditional relational database management systems provide insufficient throughput, or insufficient performance.

== History ==
Tangosol Coherence was created by Cameron Purdy and Gene Gleyzer, and initially released in December, 2001.

Oracle Corporation acquired Tangosol Inc., the original owner of the product, in April 2007, at which point it had more than 100 direct customers. Tangosol Coherence was also embedded in a number of other companies' software products, some of which belonged to Oracle Corporation's competitors.

== Features ==
Coherence provides mechanisms to integrate with other services using TopLink, Java Persistence API, Oracle Golden Gate and other platforms using APIs provided by Coherence.

Coherence can be used to manage HTTP sessions via Coherence*Web, in applications services such as Oracle WebLogic Server, IBM WebSphere, and Apache Tomcat.

In the summer of 2020, Coherence Community Edition was released as open source on GitHub. Some Coherence usage patterns are also open source and are listed and supported through the Oracle Coherence incubator. These patterns implement features such as messaging, work distribution and data replication across wide area networks with Coherence.

== See also ==
- Complex event processing
- Distributed computing
- Distributed hash table
- Distributed transaction processing
- Extreme transaction processing
- Grid computing
- Transaction processing
