= BIRT Project =

Open source software project

Eclipse BIRT Project
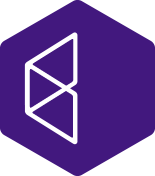

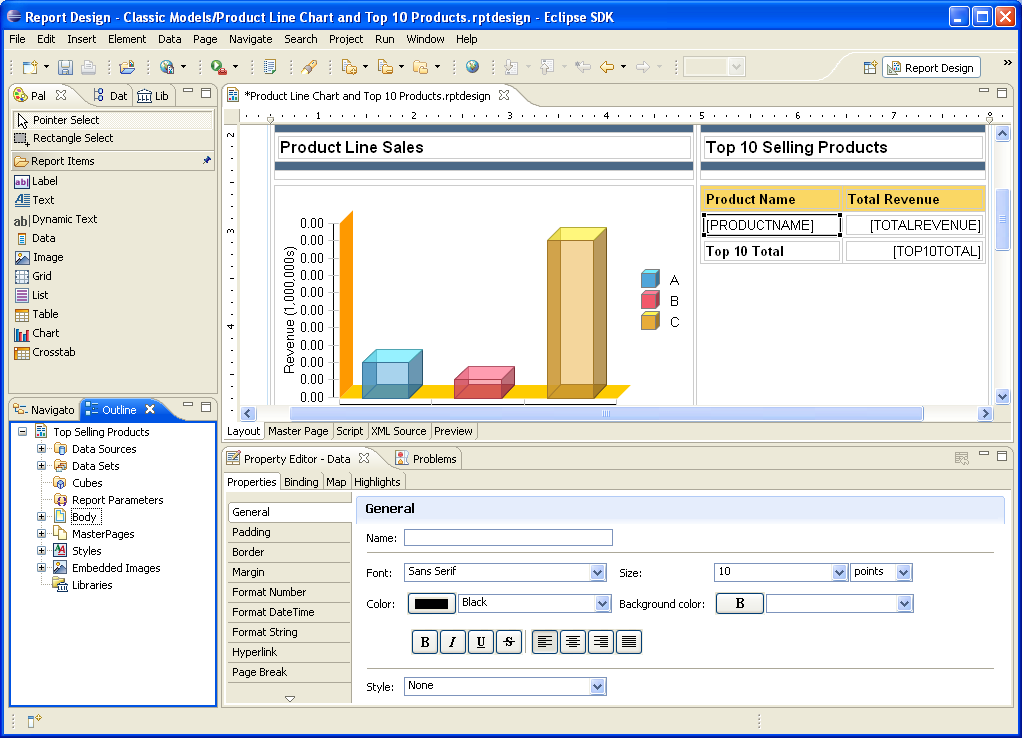
- Eclipse BIRT Report Designer
- Developer: Eclipse Foundation
- Initial release: 2005; 21 years ago
- Stable release: 4.18 / 5 December 2024; 13 months ago
- Written in: Java
- Operating system: Cross-platform
- Available in: Multilingual
- Type: Enterprise reporting / Business intelligence
- License: Eclipse Public License
- Website: www.eclipse.org/birt

The Business Intelligence and Reporting Tools (BIRT) Project is an open source software project that provides reporting and business intelligence capabilities for rich client and web applications, especially those based on Java and Java EE. BIRT is a top-level software project within the Eclipse Foundation, an independent not-for-profit consortium of software industry vendors and an open source community.

The project's stated goals are to address a wide range of reporting needs within a typical application, ranging from operational or enterprise reporting to multi-dimensional online analytical processing (OLAP). Initially, the project has focused on and delivered capabilities that allow application developers to easily design and integrate reports into applications.

The project is supported by an active community of users at BIRT Developer Center and developers at the Eclipse.org BIRT Project page.

BIRT has two main components: a visual report designer within the Eclipse IDE for creating BIRT Reports, and a runtime component for generating reports that can be deployed to any Java environment. The BIRT project also includes a charting engine that is both fully integrated into the report designer and can be used standalone to integrate charts into an application.

BIRT Report designs are persisted as XML and can access a number of different data sources including JDO datastores, JFire Scripting Objects, POJOs, SQL databases, Web Services and XML.

== History ==
The BIRT project was first proposed and sponsored by Actuate Corporation when Actuate joined the Eclipse Foundation as a Strategic Developer on August 24, 2004. The project was subsequently approved and became a top-level project within the Eclipse community on October 6, 2004. The project contributor community includes IBM, and Innovent Solutions.

In 2007 IBM's Tivoli Division adopted BIRT as the infrastructure for its Tivoli Common Reporting (TCR) product. TCR produces historical reports on Tivoli-managed IT resources and processes.

The initial project code base was designed and developed by Actuate beginning in early 2004 and donated to the Eclipse Foundation when the project was approved.

== Versions ==
Eclipse BIRT Project Released Versions
Version	Release Date	Description
1.0 Preview	March 1, 2005	Preview at EclipseCon 2005: Eclipse Report Designer, Report Engine, Chart Engine
1.0	June 6, 2005	Initial BIRT Report Designer, BIRT Report Engine, BIRT Chart Engine
1.0.1	July, 2005	Support for Eclipse 3.1; RCP version of BIRT Report Designer
2.0	January 23, 2006	Major release
2.0.1	February 22, 2006	Maintenance release
2.1	June 28, 2006	Major release as part of Eclipse Callisto Simultaneous Release
2.0.2	August 4, 2006	Maintenance release
2.1.1	September 26, 2006	Maintenance release
2.1.2	February 27, 2007	Maintenance release
2.1.3	July 5, 2007	Maintenance release
2.2	June 28, 2007	Major release as part of Eclipse Europa Simultaneous Release
2.2.1	October 2, 2007	Maintenance release
2.2.1.1	November 1, 2007	Maintenance release
2.2.2	February 27, 2008	Maintenance release
2.3	June 25, 2008	Major release as part of Eclipse Ganymede Simultaneous Release
2.3.1	September 24, 2008	"SR 1" Fall Maintenance release
2.3.2	February 25, 2009	"SR 2" Winter Maintenance release
2.5	June 24, 2009	Major release as part of Eclipse Galileo Simultaneous Release
2.5.1	September 25, 2009	"SR 1" Fall Maintenance release
2.5.2	February 28, 2010	"SR 2" Winter Maintenance release
2.6	June 24, 2010	Major release as part of Eclipse Helios Simultaneous Release
2.6.1	September 17, 2010	"SR 1" Fall Maintenance release
2.6.2	February 25, 2011	"SR 2" Spring Maintenance release
3.7	June 22, 2011	Major release as part of Eclipse Indigo Simultaneous Release
3.7.1	September 23, 2011	"SR 1" Fall Maintenance release
3.7.2	February 24, 2012	"SR 2" Maintenance release
4.2.0	June 27, 2012	Major release as part of Eclipse Juno Simultaneous Release
4.2.1	September 28, 2012	Maintenance release
4.2.2	February 22, 2013	Maintenance release
4.3	June 26, 2013	Major release as part of Eclipse Kepler Simultaneous Release
4.3.1	September 27, 2013	Maintenance release
4.3.2	February 28, 2014	Maintenance release
4.4.0	June 25, 2014	Major release as part of Eclipse Luna Simultaneous Release
4.4.1	September 26, 2014	Maintenance release
4.4.2	February 27, 2015	Maintenance release
4.5.0	June 24, 2015	Major release as part of Eclipse Mars Simultaneous Release
4.6.0	June 22, 2016	Major release as part of Eclipse Neon Simultaneous Release
4.7.0	June 28, 2017	Major release as part of Eclipse Oxygen Simultaneous Release
4.8.0	June 27, 2018	Major release as part of Eclipse Photon Simultaneous Release
4.9.0	June 16, 2021	Minor release

== Bibliography ==
- Hague, Nola; Tatchell, Jane (July 27, 2008). BIRT: A Field Guide to Reporting (2nd ed.). Addison-Wesley Professional. p. 794. ISBN 978-0-321-58027-6.
- Weathersby, Jason; Bondur, Tom; Chatalbasheva, Iana; French, Don (July 28, 2008). Integrating and Extending BIRT (2nd ed.). Addison-Wesley Professional. p. 724. ISBN 978-0-321-58030-6.
- Ward, John (February 22, 2008). Practical Data Analysis and Reporting with BIRT (1st ed.). Packt Publishing. p. 312. ISBN 978-1-84719-109-0.
- Bappoo, Paul (March 23, 2010). BIRT for Beginners (1st ed.). Lulu. p. 241. ISBN 978-1-4457-4886-3. Archived from the original on 2010-12-13.
