= Apache OpenJPA =

Open-source implementation of Java Persistence API

- Developer(s): Apache Software Foundation
- Stable release: 4.1.0 / March 25, 2025; 41 days ago
- Repository: OpenJPA Repository
- Written in: Java
- Operating system: Cross-platform
- Platform: Java
- Size: 15.9 MB (archived binary) / 11.8 MB (archived source)
- Type: Object-relational mapping
- License: Apache License 2.0
- Website: openjpa.apache.org

OpenJPA is an open source implementation of the Java Persistence API specification. It is an object-relational mapping (ORM) solution for the Java language, which simplifies storing objects in databases. It is open-source software distributed under the Apache License 2.0.

== History ==
Kodo, a Java Data Objects implementation, was originally developed by SolarMetric, Inc in 2001. BEA Systems acquired SolarMetric in 2005, where Kodo was expanded to be an implementation of both the JDO (JSR 12) and JPA (JSR 220) specifications. In 2006, BEA donated a large part of the Kodo source code to the Apache Software Foundation under the name OpenJPA. The donated source code will be the core persistence engine of BEA Weblogic Server, IBM WebSphere, and the Geronimo Application Server. In May 2007, OpenJPA graduated from the incubator to a top-level project and also passed Sun's Technology Compatibility Kit compliant with the Java Persistence API.

== See also ==
- Persistence
- EclipseLink
- Hibernate
- ActiveJPA
- NoSQL datastores like Infinispan
