= Actuate Corporation =

American software company

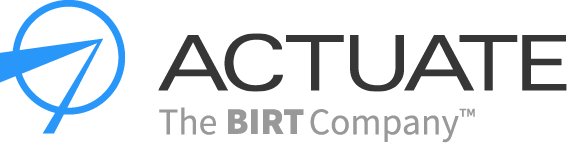
- Type: Subsidiary
- Traded as: Nasdaq: BIRT
- Industry: Computer software, Business intelligence, Enterprise Reporting, Business analytics
- Founded: 1993; 33 years ago
- Headquarters: San Mateo, California, United States
- Area served: Worldwide
- Products: BIRT, BIRT iHub, BIRT iHub F-Type, BIRT Analytics, Actuate Customer Communications Suite
- Revenue: ▲US$134.6 million (FY 2013)
- Operating income: ▲US$23.4 million (FY 2013)
- Net income: ▲US$16.7 million (FY 2013)
- Total assets: ▲US$196.1 million (FY 2013)
- Total equity: ▲US$128.8 million (FY 2013)
- Number of employees: 570 (as of December 31, 2013)
- Parent: OpenText
- Website: www.opentext.com/what-we-do/products/analytics/

Actuate Corporation is a reporting, analytics and customer communications software company based in San Mateo, California, part of the San Francisco Bay Area and Silicon Valley. The company’s software is intended for use in the finance, government, manufacturing, telecommunications, and healthcare industries, among others.

== History ==
Actuate Corporation was founded in 1993.

The company is known for its creation of the open source Eclipse BIRT business data reporting project launched by the Eclipse Foundation in 2004.

BIRT iHub F-Type is a freemium software product released by Actuate on July 10, 2014.

In 2015, Actuate Corporation was acquired by OpenText for approximately $163 million.
