= Semantic service-oriented architecture =

A Semantic Service Oriented Architecture (SSOA) is an architecture that allows for scalable and controlled Enterprise Application Integration solutions. SSOA describes an approach to enterprise-scale IT infrastructure. It leverages rich, machine-interpretable descriptions of data, services, and processes to enable software agents to autonomously interact to perform critical mission functions. SSOA is technically founded on three notions:

1. The principles of Service-oriented architecture (SOA);
2. Standard Based Design (SBD); and
3. Semantics-based computing.

SSOA combines and implements these computer science concepts into a robust, extensible architecture capable of enabling complex, powerful functions.

== Applications ==
In the health care industry, SSOA of HL7 has long been implemented. Other protocols include LOINC, PHIN, and HIPAA related standards. There is a series of SSOA-related ISO standards published for financial services, which can be found at the ISO's website^{,}^{,}. Some financial sectors also adopt EMV standards to facilitate European consumers. A part of SSOA on transport and trade are in the ISO sections of 03.220.20 and 35.240.60^{,}. Some general guidelines of the technology and the standards in other fields are partially located at 25.040.40, 35.240.99^{,}^{,}.

== See also ==
- Cyber security standards
- ISO/IEC 7816
- ISO 8583
- ISO/IEC 8859
- ISO 9241
- ISO 9660
- ISO/IEC 11179
- ISO/IEC 15408
- ISO/IEC 17799
- ISO/IEC 27000-series
- Service component architecture
- Semantic web
- EMML
- Business Intelligence 2.0 (BI 2.0)
