= Spring Batch =

- Developer(s): VMware
- Stable release: 5.0.0 / November 24, 2022; 2 years ago
- Preview release: 4.3.0.BUILD-SNAPSHOT / October 2, 2019; 5 years ago
- Repository: https://github.com/spring-projects/spring-batch
- Written in: Java
- Operating system: Cross-platform
- Platform: Java Virtual Machine
- Type: Application framework
- License: Apache License 2.0
- Website: http://docs.spring.io/spring-batch/

Spring Batch is an open source framework for batch processing. It is a lightweight, comprehensive solution designed to enable the development of robust batch applications, which are often found in modern enterprise systems. Spring Batch builds upon the POJO-based development approach of the Spring Framework.

Spring Batch provides reusable functions that are essential in processing large volumes of records, including logging/tracing, transaction management, job processing statistics, job restart, skip, and resource management. It also provides more advanced technical services and features that will enable extremely high-volume and high performance batch jobs through optimization and partitioning techniques. Simple as well as complex, high-volume batch jobs can leverage the framework in a highly scalable manner to process significant volumes of information.

Spring Batch is part of the Spring Portfolio.

Spring Batch 1.0.0 was made available to the public in March 2008. Spring Batch 2.0.0 was released in April 2009.

Several books have been published on Spring Batch.

== See also ==
- Spring Framework
- Diagrammatic representation
