= Hibernate (framework) =

Object–relational mapping tool

Hibernate ORM
- Developer: Red Hat
- Release: 23 May 2001; 25 years ago
- Stable release: 7.0.0.Final / May 19, 2025; 17 months ago
- Written in: Java
- Operating system: Cross-platform (JVM)
- Platform: Java Virtual Machine
- Type: Object–relational mapping
- License: Apache License 2.0
- Website: hibernate.org/orm/
- Repository: github.com/hibernate/hibernate-orm

Hibernate ORM (or simply Hibernate) is an object–relational mapping tool for the Java programming language. It provides a framework for mapping an object-oriented domain model to a relational database. Hibernate handles object–relational impedance mismatch problems by replacing direct, persistent database accesses with high-level object handling functions.

Hibernate is free software that is distributed under the Apache License. Versions prior to 7.0.0.Beta4 were distributed under the GNU Lesser General Public License 2.1.

Hibernate's primary feature is mapping from Java classes to database tables, and mapping from Java data types to SQL data types. Hibernate also provides data query and retrieval facilities. It generates SQL calls and relieves the developer from the manual handling and object conversion of the result set.

== Standards ==
Hibernate ORM is a certified compatible implementation of the industry-standard Jakarta Persistence (formerly Java Persistence API) and Jakarta Data specifications.

== Mapping ==
The mapping of Java classes to database tables is implemented by the configuration of an XML file or by using Java annotations. When using an XML file, Hibernate can generate skeleton source code for the persistence classes. This is auxiliary when annotations are used. Hibernate can use the XML file or the Java annotations to maintain the database schema.

There are provided facilities to arrange one-to-many and many-to-many relationships between classes. In addition to managing associations between objects, Hibernate can also manage reflexive associations wherein an object has a one-to-many relationship with other instances of the class type.

Hibernate supports the mapping of custom value types. This makes the following scenarios possible:

- Overriding the default SQL type when mapping a column to a property.
- Mapping Java enums to columns as though they were regular properties.
- Mapping a single property to multiple columns.

Definition: Objects in an object-oriented application follow OOP principles, while objects in the back-end follow database normalization principles, resulting in different representation requirements. This problem is called "object–relational impedance mismatch". Mapping is a way of resolving the object–relational impedance mismatch problem.

Mapping informs the ORM tool of what Java class object to store in which database table.

== Hibernate Query Language (HQL) ==
Hibernate provides a SQL inspired language called Hibernate Query Language (HQL) for writing SQL-like queries against Hibernate's data objects. Criteria Queries are provided as an object-oriented alternative to HQL. Criteria Query is used to modify the objects and provide the restriction for the objects. HQL (Hibernate Query Language) is the object-oriented version of SQL. It generates database independent queries so that there is no need to write database-specific queries. Without this capability, changing the database would require individual SQL queries to be changed as well, leading to maintenance issues.

== Persistence ==
Hibernate provides transparent persistence for Plain Old Java Objects (POJOs). The only strict requirement for a persistent class is a no-argument constructor, though not necessarily public. Proper behavior in some applications also requires special attention to the equals(Object obj) and hashCode() methods in the java.lang.Object classes. Hibernate recommends providing an identifier attribute, and this is planned to be a mandatory requirement in a future release.

Collections of data objects are typically stored in Java collection classes, such as implementations of the java.util.Set and java.util.List interfaces. Java generics, introduced in Java 5, are also supported. Hibernate can be configured to lazy load associated collections. Lazy loading is the default as of Hibernate 3.

Related objects can be configured to cascade operations from one object to the other. For example, a parent Album class object can be configured to cascade its save() and delete() operations to its child Track class objects.

== Integration ==
Hibernate can be used both in standalone Java applications and in Java EE applications using servlets, EJB session beans, and JBI service components. It can also be included as a feature in other programming languages. For example, Adobe integrated Hibernate into version 9 of ColdFusion (which runs on J2EE app servers) with an abstraction layer of new functions and syntax added into CFML.

== Entities and components ==
In Hibernate jargon, an entity is a stand-alone object in Hibernate's persistent mechanism which can be manipulated independently of other objects. In contrast, a component is subordinate to an entity and can be manipulated only with respect to that entity. For example, an Album object may represent an entity; but the Tracks object associated with the Album objects would represent a component of the Album entity, if it is assumed that Tracks can only be saved or retrieved from the database through the Album object. Unlike J2EE, Hibernate can switch databases.

== History ==
Hibernate was started in 2001 by Gavin King with colleagues from Cirrus Technologies as an alternative to using EJB2-style entity beans. The original goal was to offer better persistence capabilities than those offered by EJB2; by simplifying the complexities and supplementing certain missing features.

In early 2003, the Hibernate development team began Hibernate2 releases, which offered many significant improvements over the first release.

JBoss, Inc. (now part of Red Hat) later hired the lead Hibernate developers in order to further its development.

In 2005, Hibernate version 3.0 was released. Key features included a new Interceptor/Callback architecture, user defined filters, and JDK 5.0 Annotations (Java's metadata feature). As of 2010, Hibernate 3 (version 3.5.0 and up) was a certified implementation of the Java Persistence API 2.0 specification via a wrapper for the Core module which provides conformity with the JSR 317 standard.

In Dec 2011, Hibernate Core 4.0.0 Final was released. This includes new features such as multi-tenancy support, introduction of org.hibernate.service.ServiceRegistry (a major change in how Hibernate builds and manages "services"), better session opening from org.hibernate.SessionFactory, improved integration via org.hibernate.integrator.spi.Integrator and auto discovery, internationalization support, message codes in logging, and a more distinction between the API, SPI or implementation classes.

In December 2012, Hibernate ORM 4.1.9 Final was released.

In Mar 2013, Hibernate ORM 4.2 Final was released.

In December 2013, Hibernate ORM 4.3.0 Final was released. It features Java Persistence API 2.1.

In September 2015, Hibernate ORM 5.0.2 Final was released. It has improved bootstrapping, hibernate-java8, hibernate-spatial, Karaf support.

In November 2018, Hibernate ORM 5.1.17 Final was released. This is the final release of the 5.1 series.

In October 2018, Hibernate ORM 5.3 Final was released. It featured Java Persistence API 2.2 inheritance caching.

In December 2018, Hibernate ORM 5.4.0 Final was released.

In March, 2022, Hibernate ORM 6.0.0 Final was released, a "major redesign [which] has touched almost every subsystem of Hibernate, including the APIs, mapping annotations, and the query language". The last of the 6.x series is version 6.6.x with 6.6.0.Final released in August 2024 and is in limited support in 2026. The 6.6 series support Java 11, 17, 21 and 25 and is compatible with Jakarta Persistence 3.1 and Jakarta EE 10.

In May 2025, Hibernate ORM 7.0.0 Final was released, with support for Jakarta Persistence 3.2 and Jakarta Data 1.0. 7.1.0.Final was released in August 2025 and 7.2.0.Final in December 2025 both 7.1 and 7.2 series support Java 17, 21 and 25 and are compatible with Jakarta Persistence 3.2 and Jakarta EE 11.

== Application programming interface ==
The Hibernate API is provided in the Java package org.hibernate.

=== org.hibernate.SessionFactory interface ===
The org.hibernate.SessionFactory interface is the native equivalent version of the JPA's standard jakarta.persistence.EntityManagerFactory.

=== org.hibernate.Session interface ===
The org.hibernate.Session interface represents a Hibernate session, i.e., the main point of the manipulation performed on the database entities. The latter activities include (among the other things) managing the persistence state (transient, persisted, detached) of the objects, fetching the persisted ones from the database and the management of the transaction demarcation.

An org.hibernate.Session is intended to last as long as the logical transaction on the database. Due to the latter feature, org.hibernate.Session implementations are not expected to be thread safe nor to be used by multiple clients.

== Software components ==
The Hibernate software includes the following components:

- Hibernate ORM (known as Hibernate Core before release 4.1) – the base software for an object–relational mapping solution for Java environments
- Hibernate Annotations (merged into Hibernate Core/ORM since version 3.6) – metadata that governs the transformation of data between the object-oriented model and the relational database model according to the JSR 317 Java Persistence API (JPA 2)
- Hibernate EntityManager (merged into Hibernate Core/ORM since version 5.2)– together with Hibernate Annotations, a wrapper that implements a JSR 317 Java Persistence API (JPA 2) persistence solution
- Hibernate Envers – auditing and versioning of persistent classes
- Hibernate OGM (Object/Grid Mapper) – an extension to store data in a NoSQL store
- Hibernate Shards – horizontal partitioning for multiple relational databases
  - While Hibernate Shards is not compatible with 4.x releases of Hibernate Core, some of the Shards capability was integrated into Core in the 4.0 release
- Hibernate Search – integrates the full text library functionality from Apache Lucene in the Hibernate and JPA model
- Hibernate Tools – a set of tools implemented as a suite of Eclipse plugins and Ant tasks included in JBoss Developer Studio
- Hibernate Validator – the reference implementation of JSR 303 Bean Validation
- Hibernate Processor – an annotation processor that creates Java Persistence static metamodel classes and Jakarta Data repository implementations using the JSR 269 Pluggable Annotation Processing API
- NHibernate – an object–relational mapping solution for the .NET Framework

== See also ==
- List of JBoss software
- List of object–relational mapping software
- NHibernate
- Serialization
- Service Data Object
- MySQL
- Apache Cassandra
- Spring Framework
- MyBatis

== Bibliography ==
- Linwood, Ananda; Minter, Dave (May 28, 2010), Beginning Hibernate (Second ed.), Apress, p. 400, ISBN 978-1-4302-2850-9, archived from the original on December 5, 2010
- Bernard, Emmanuel; Griffin, John (December 30, 2008), Hibernate Search in Action (First ed.), Manning Publications, p. 488, ISBN 978-1-933988-64-1
- Elliott, James; O'Brien, Tim (April 22, 2008), Harnessing Hibernate (First ed.), O'Reilly Media, p. 380, ISBN 978-0-596-51772-4
- Bauer, Christian; King, Gavin; Gregory, Gary (November 8, 2015). Java Persistence with Hibernate. Manning Publications. ISBN 978-1-61729-045-9.
- Linwood, Jeff; Minter, Dave (August 25, 2006), Beginning Hibernate: From Novice to Professional (Third ed.), Apress, p. 360, ISBN 1-59059-693-5, archived from the original on December 24, 2010
- Minter, Dave; Linwood, Jeff (June 27, 2005), Pro Hibernate 3 (First ed.), Apress, pp. 242, ISBN 1-59059-511-4
- Iverson, Will (December 2, 2004), Hibernate: A J2EE Developer's Guide (First ed.), Addison Wesley, pp. 384, ISBN 0-321-26819-9
- Pugh, Eric; Gradecki, Joseph D. (October 8, 2004), Professional Hibernate (Programmer to Programmer) (First ed.), Wrox, p. 456, ISBN 0-7645-7677-1, archived from the original on April 4, 2009
- Bauer, Christian; King, Gavin (August 1, 2004), Hibernate In Action (Second ed.), Manning Publications, pp. 400, ISBN 1-932394-15-X
- James, Elliott (May 10, 2004), Hibernate: A Developer's Notebook (First ed.), O'Reilly Media, pp. 190, ISBN 0-596-00696-9
