= Manning Publications =

American publisher

Manning Publications Company
- Founded: 1990
- Founder: Marjan Bace and Lee Fitzpatrick
- Country of origin: United States
- Headquarters location: Shelter Island, New York
- Distribution: Simon & Schuster
- Publication types: Books
- Nonfiction topics: technology
- Official website: www.manning.com

Manning Publications is an American publisher specializing in content relating to computers. Manning mainly publishes textbooks but also release videos and projects for professionals within the computing world.

== Company ==
Manning was founded in 1990 as a book packaging business by business partners Marjan Bace and Lee Fitzpatrick.

Manning did business with most of the established technical publishers as well as with the IEEE Computer Society Press. Their scope included all of engineering and computing. An early success was the publication of a materials science series of a dozen specialized tomes; it included the large Encyclopedia of Materials Characterization with over 50 contributors. Soon Manning began to see computing topics as the liveliest and most interesting.

Manning would eventually be drawn to the computer industry. Computing soon became the focus of Manning's publishing. Manning's first customer for a computer book was Addison Wesley. Addison Wesley's reputation helped open doors at other leading commercial houses, a number of whom became Manning customers.

The company introduced a unique Manning Early Access Program (MEAP) which allows subscribers to receive incremental completed chapters before the book is finally published. It has also partnered with its competitor O'Reilly Media to add some of its digital library on the Safari Books Online cloud platform.

== Branding ==
The covers of books published by Manning feature illustrations of traditional dress customs from around the world. These illustrations are from a variety of historical sources, such as the 1805 edition of Sylvain Maréchal's four-volume compendium of regional dress customs, and Thomas Jefferys' A Collection of the Dresses of Different Nations, Ancient and Modern.

== See also ==
- Category:Manning Publications books
