= EclipseLink =

Persistence services project

- Developer: Eclipse Foundation
- Stable release: 4.0.4 / July 19, 2024; 22 months ago
- Written in: Java
- Operating system: Cross-platform
- Platform: Java platform
- Type: Object-relational mapping
- License: Eclipse Public License v1.0 Eclipse Distribution License v1.0
- Website: www.eclipse.org/eclipselink/
- Repository: github.com/eclipse-ee4j/eclipselink

EclipseLink is the open source Eclipse Persistence Services Project from the Eclipse Foundation. The software provides an extensible framework that allows Java developers to interact with various data services, including databases, web services, Object XML mapping (OXM), and enterprise information systems (EIS). EclipseLink supports a number of persistence standards including:

- Jakarta Persistence (JPA)
- Jakarta XML Binding (JAXB)
- Jakarta Connectors (JCA)
- Service Data Objects (SDO)

EclipseLink is based on the TopLink product from which Oracle contributed the source code to create the EclipseLink project. The original contribution was from TopLink's 11g code base, and the entire code-base/feature set was contributed, with only EJB 2 Container-Managed Persistence (CMP) and some minor Oracle Application Server specific integration removed. This differs from the TopLink Essentials GlassFish contribution, which did not include some key enterprise features. The package names were changed and some of the code and configuration was moved around.

The TopLink Mapping Workbench user interface has also been contributed to the project.

EclipseLink is the intended path forward for persistence for Oracle and TopLink. It is intended that the next major release of Oracle TopLink will include EclipseLink as well as the next major release of Oracle Application Server.

EclipseLink supports usage in an OSGi environment.

Sun Microsystems has selected the EclipseLink project to be the reference implementation for JPA 2.0., Oracle did the same for JPA 2.1 and later JPA specifications.
