= Java annotation =

Syntactic metadata for Java source code

In the Java computer programming language, an annotation is a form of syntactic metadata that can be added to Java source code, like an attribute. Classes, methods, variables, parameters and Java packages may be annotated. Like Javadoc tags, Java annotations can be read from source files. Unlike Javadoc tags, Java annotations can also be embedded in and read from Java class files generated by the Java compiler. This allows annotations to be retained by the Java virtual machine at run-time and read via reflection. It is possible to create meta-annotations out of the existing ones in Java.

== History ==
The Java platform has various ad-hoc annotation mechanisms—for example, the transient modifier, or the @Deprecated javadoc tag. The Java Specification Request JSR-175 introduced the general-purpose annotation (also known as metadata) facility to the Java Community Process in 2002; it gained approval in September 2004.

Annotations became available in the language itself beginning with version 1.5 of the Java Development Kit (JDK). The apt tool provided a provisional interface for compile-time annotation processing in JDK version 1.5; JSR-269 formalized this, and it became integrated into the javac compiler in version 1.6.

== Built-in annotations ==
Java defines a set of annotations that are built into the language. Of the seven standard annotations, three are part of java.lang, and the remaining four are imported from java.lang.annotation.

Annotation	Package	Description
@Deprecated	java.lang	Marks the method as obsolete. Causes a compile warning if the method is used.
@FunctionalInterface	java.lang	Marks an interface as intended to be a functional interface.
@Override	java.lang	Marks that the method overrides an ancestor class-defined method. Causes a compilation error if the method is not found in one of the parent classes or implemented interfaces.
@SafeVarargs	java.lang	Suppress warnings for all callers of a method or constructor with a generics varargs parameter, since Java 7.
@SuppressWarnings	java.lang	Instructs the compiler to suppress the compile time warnings specified in the annotation parameters.
@Documented	java.lang.annotation	Marks another annotation for inclusion in the documentation.
@Inherited	java.lang.annotation	Marks another annotation to be inherited to subclasses of annotated class (by default annotations are not inherited by subclasses).
@Native	java.lang.annotation	Marks a field defining a constant value as potentially being referenced from native code.
@Repeatable	java.lang.annotation	Marks another annotation as repeatable.
@Retention	java.lang.annotation	Specifies how the marked annotation is stored, whether in code only, compiled into the class, or available at runtime through reflection.
@Target	java.lang.annotation	Marks another annotation to restrict what kind of Java elements the annotation may be applied to.

In Jakarta EE (formerly Java Platform, Enterprise Edition), the following annotations also exist in jakarta.annotation (formerly javax.annotation):

Annotation	Package	Description
@Generated	jakarta.annotation	Marks source code that has been generated (i.e. not written by a user, or automatically generated by a computer).
@Resource	jakarta.annotation	Marks a class, method, or field as a reference to a resource.
@Resources	jakarta.annotation	Declares reference to resources, as a container for multiple resource declarations.
@PostConstruct	jakarta.annotation	Marks a method to indicate that it must be executed after dependency injection to perform initialization, i.e. the method must be invoked before the class is used.
@PreDestroy	jakarta.annotation	Marks a method as a callback notification to indicate the instance is in the process of being removed by the container, i.e. the method is used to release resources held by the instance.
@Priority	jakarta.annotation	Marks any program element to indicate in what order they should be used.
@Nonnull	jakarta.annotation	Marks any element that cannot be null.
@Nullable	jakarta.annotation	Marks any element that has the explicit possibility of being null.
@RunAs	jakarta.annotation	Defines the security role of the application during execution in a Jakarta EE container.
@RolesAllowed	jakarta.annotation.security	Marks a method to specify security roles permitted to access the method.
@PermitAll	jakarta.annotation.security	Marks a method to specify that all security roles may access the method.
@DenyAll	jakarta.annotation.security	Marks a method to specify that no security roles may access the method.
@DeclareRoles	jakarta.annotation.security	Specifies security roles used by the application.
@DataSourceDefinition	jakarta.annotation.sql	Defines a container DataSource that is registered with Java Naming and Directory Interface (JNDI).
@DataSourceDefinitions	jakarta.annotation.sql	Declares a container DataSource, acting as a container for multiple data source declarations.

There was previously an annotation, @ManagedBean, located in jakarta.annotation, which was historically used to declare a Managed Bean which are container managed objects that support a small set of basic services such as resource injection, lifecycle callbacks and interceptors. However, it has been removed.

== Example ==
=== Built-in annotations ===
This example demonstrates the use of the @Override annotation. It instructs the compiler to check parent classes for matching methods. In this case, an error is generated because the gettype() method of class Cat doesn't in fact override getType() of class Animal like is desired, because of the mismatching case. If the @Override annotation were absent, a new method of name gettype() would be created in class Cat.

public class Animal {
    public void speak() {}

    public String getType() {
        return "Generic animal";
    }
}

public class Cat extends Animal {
    @Override
    public void speak() { // This is a good override.
        System.out.println("Meow.");
    }

    @Override
    public String gettype() { // Compile-time error due to typo: should be getType() not gettype().
        return "Cat";
    }
}

=== Custom annotations ===
Annotation type declarations are similar to normal interface declarations. An at-sign (@) precedes the keyword "interface".

// @Twizzle is an annotation to method toggle().
@Twizzle
public void toggle() {

}

// Declares the annotation Twizzle.
public @interface Twizzle {

}

Annotations may include a set of key-value pairs, which are modeled as methods of the annotation type. Each method declaration defines an element of the annotation type. Method declarations must not have any parameters or a throws clause. Return types are restricted to primitives, java.lang.String, java.lang.Class, enums, annotations, and arrays of the preceding types. Methods can have default values.

// Same as: @Edible(value = true)
@Edible(true)
Item item = new Carrot();

public @interface Edible {
    boolean value() default false;
}

@Author(first = "Oompah", last = "Loompah")
Book book = new Book();

public @interface Author {
    String first();
    String last();
}

Annotations themselves may be annotated to indicate where and when they can be used:

import java.lang.annotation.*;

@Retention(RetentionPolicy.RUNTIME) // Make this annotation accessible at runtime via reflection.
@Target({ElementType.METHOD}) // This annotation can only be applied to class methods.
public @interface Tweezable {}

The compiler reserves a set of special annotations (including @Deprecated, @Override and @SuppressWarnings) for syntactic purposes.

Annotations are widely used by frameworks as a way of conveniently applying behaviors to user-defined classes and methods that must otherwise be declared in an external source (such as an XML configuration file) or programmatically (with API calls). For instance, the library Project Lombok makes extensive usage of annotations to reduce boilerplate. The following, for example, is an annotated Jakarta Persistence data class:

package org.wikipedia.examples;

import java.io.Serializable;

import jakarta.persistence.Column;
import jakarta.persistence.Entity;
import jakarta.persistence.GenerationType;
import jakarta.persistence.GeneratedValue;
import jakarta.persistence.Id;
import jakarta.persistence.Table;

@Entity // Declares this an entity bean
@Table(name = "people") // Maps the bean to SQL table "people"
public class Person implements Serializable {
    @Id // Map this to the primary key column.
    @GeneratedValue(strategy = GenerationType.AUTO) // Database will generate new primary keys, not us.
    private Integer id;

    @Column(length = 32) // Truncate column values to 32 characters.
    private String name;

    public Integer getId() {
        return id;
    }

    public void setId(Integer id) {
        this.id = id;
    }

    public String getName() {
        return name;
    }

    public void setName(String name) {
        this.name = name;
    }
}

The annotations are not method calls and will not, by themselves, do anything. Rather, the class object is passed to the Jakarta Persistence implementation at run-time, which then extracts the annotations to generate an object–relational mapping.

A complete example is given below:

package org.wikipedia.examples.annotation;

import java.lang.annotation.Documented;
import java.lang.annotation.ElementType;
import java.lang.annotation.Inherited;
import java.lang.annotation.Retention;
import java.lang.annotation.RetentionPolicy;
import java.lang.annotation.Target;

@Documented
@Retention(RetentionPolicy.RUNTIME)
@Target({
    ElementType.TYPE, ElementType.METHOD,
    ElementType.CONSTRUCTOR, ElementType.ANNOTATION_TYPE,
    ElementType.PACKAGE, ElementType.FIELD, ElementType.LOCAL_VARIABLE
})
@Inherited
public @interface Unfinished {
    public enum Priority { LOW, MEDIUM, HIGH }
    String value();
    String[] changedBy() default "";
    String[] lastChangedBy() default "";
    Priority priority() default Priority.MEDIUM;
    String createdBy() default "James Gosling";
    String lastChanged() default "2011-07-08";
}

package org.wikipedia.examples.annotation;

public @interface UnderConstruction {
    String owner() default "Patrick Naughton";
    String value() default "Object is Under Construction.";
    String createdBy() default "Mike Sheridan";
    String lastChanged() default "2011-07-08";
}

Then, using Jakarta Faces:

package org.wikipedia.examples.validators;

import jakarta.faces.application.FacesMessage;
import jakarta.faces.component.UIComponent;
import jakarta.faces.context.FacesContext;
import jakarta.faces.validator.Validator;
import jakarta.faces.validator.ValidatorException;

import org.wikipedia.examples.annotation.UnderConstruction;
import org.wikipedia.examples.annotation.Unfinished;
import org.wikipedia.examples.annotation.Unfinished.Priority;
import org.wikipedia.examples.util.Util;

@UnderConstruction(owner = "Jon Doe")
public class DateValidator implements Validator {
    public void validate(FacesContext context, UIComponent component, Object value) throws ValidatorException {
        String date = (String) value;
        String errorLabel = "Please enter a valid date.";
        if (!component.getAttributes().isEmpty()) {
            errorLabel = (String) component.getAttributes().get("errordisplayval");
        }

        if (!Util.validateAGivenDate(date)) {
            @Unfinished(
                changedBy = "Steve",
                value = "whether to add message to context or not, confirm",
                priority = Priority.HIGH
            )
            FacesMessage message = new FacesMessage();
            message.setSeverity(FacesMessage.SEVERITY_ERROR);
            message.setSummary(errorLabel);
            message.setDetail(errorLabel);
            throw new ValidatorException(message);
        }
    }
}

== Processing ==
When Java source code is compiled, annotations can be processed by compiler plug-ins called annotation processors. Processors can produce informational messages or create additional Java source files or resources, which in turn may be compiled and processed. However, annotation processors cannot modify the annotated code itself. (Code modifications may be implemented using methods beyond the Java Language Specification.) The Java compiler conditionally stores annotation metadata in the class files, if the annotation has a RetentionPolicy of CLASS or RUNTIME. Later, the JVM or other programs can look for the metadata to determine how to interact with the program elements or change their behavior.

In addition to processing an annotation using an annotation processor, a Java programmer can write their own code that uses reflection to process the annotation. Java SE 5 supports a new interface that is defined in the java.lang.reflect package. This package contains the interface called AnnotatedElement that is implemented by the Java reflection classes including Class, Constructor, Field, Method, and Package. The implementations of this interface are used to represent an annotated element of the program currently running in the Java Virtual Machine. This interface allows annotations to be read reflectively.

The AnnotatedElement interface provides access to annotations having RUNTIME retention. This access is provided by the getAnnotation, getAnnotations, and isAnnotationPresent methods. Because annotation types are compiled and stored in byte code files just like classes, the annotations returned by these methods can be queried just like any regular Java object. A complete example of processing an annotation is provided below:

package org.wikipedia.examples.annotation;

import java.lang.annotation.Retention;
import java.lang.annotation.RetentionPolicy;

// This is the annotation to be processed
// Default for Target is all Java Elements
// Change retention policy to RUNTIME (default is CLASS)
@Retention(RetentionPolicy.RUNTIME)
public @interface TypeHeader {
    // Default value specified for developer attribute
    String developer() default "Unknown";
    String lastModified();
    String[] teamMembers();
    int meaningOfLife();
}

// This is the annotation being applied to a class
@TypeHeader(
    developer = "Bob Bee",
    lastModified = "2013-02-12",
    teamMembers = { "Ann", "Dan", "Fran" },
    meaningOfLife = 42
)
public class SetCustomAnnotation {
    // Class contents go here
}

package org.wikipedia.examples;

// This is the example code that processes the annotation
import java.lang.annotation.Annotation;
import java.lang.reflect.AnnotatedElement;

public class UseCustomAnnotation {
    public static void main(String[] args) {
        Class<SetCustomAnnotation> classObject = SetCustomAnnotation.class;
        readAnnotation(classObject);
    }

    static void readAnnotation(AnnotatedElement element) {
        try {
            System.out.println("Annotation element values: %n");
            if (element.isAnnotationPresent(TypeHeader.class)) {
                // getAnnotation returns Annotation type
                Annotation singleAnnotation = element.getAnnotation(TypeHeader.class);
                TypeHeader header = (TypeHeader) singleAnnotation;

                System.out.printf("Developer: %s%n", header.developer());
                System.out.printf("Last Modified: %s%n", header.lastModified());

                // teamMembers returned as String[]
                System.out.print("Team members: ");
                for (String member : header.teamMembers()) {
                    System.out.printf("%s, ", member);
                }
                System.out.println();

                System.out.println("Meaning of Life: %s%n", header.meaningOfLife());
            }
        } catch (Exception e) {
            e.printStackTrace();
        }
    }
}

Libraries such as JUnit use annotation processing to generate unit tests.

== See also ==
- Jakarta Annotations
- CLI Attributes
- Java
- Java virtual machine
- Model-driven architecture
- C++ annotations
- Python decorators, inspired by Java annotations, which have a similar syntax.
