= Sony Ericsson Java Platform =

The Sony Ericsson Java Platform is a set of profiles describing particular Sony Ericsson Java implementation. It was designed to help developers to focus on a platform rather than on a variety of different product names. Two platform branches exist, supporting Symbian (SJP) and non-Symbian (JP) based phones respectively. The platforms are implemented through an evolutionary approach in order to ensure forwards compatibility between platform versions, which means that all JSRs (except the optional) implemented on one platform are also implemented on all higher platforms. Normally each platform version is used in several phone models. Some platform features are optional, that is, configurable. For example, the Java Bluetooth APIs (JSR 82) are only enabled for phones which actually support Bluetooth wireless technology. These interfaces are mostly invisible to the end user, who only has to download a JAR file containing the application to the phone.

Java Platform	Models	Features	Optional JSR 82	Optional VSCL 2.0	Flash Lite version
JP-8 (8.5)	Yari, Aino, Hazel*, Elm*, Cedar*, Zylo*	KML Support, Network Bearer API, JSR 238 Extensions, SIM Application Toolkit	Yes		3.1 (* also has Widget Manager)
JP-8 (8.4)	C510, C901, C903, C905, G705, W508, W705, W715, W995, T715	Project Capuchin API	Yes		2.1
JP-8 (8.3)	C702, C902, W760, W980, Z770, Z780, T700, W595	JSR 179, JSR 256 (Mobile Sensor API)	All		2.1
JP-8 (8.0-8.2)	G502, K630, K660, K850/K858, V640, W890/W898, W910/W908, Z750	JSR 211, JSR 177, JSR 234 (full support), JSR 239, JSR 238, JSR 229, JSR 226 (SVG), JSR 180, JSR 248 (MSA), MIDP 2.1, JSR 256 (hardware dependent), JSR 179 (hardware dependent)	All		2.0
JP-7	K530, K550, K610, K770, K790, K800, K810, S500, T650, W380, W580, W610, W660, W710, W830, W850, W880, Z310, Z610, Z710	JSR 234 (Camera capabilities)	Not Z310		1.1
JP-6	K310, K320, K510, V630, W200, W300, W550, W600, W810, W900, Z530, Z550, Z558	JSR 205, JSR 172	Not K310, W200		
JP-5	D750, K600, K750, V600, W700, W800, Z520, Z525	JSR 75	All	V800 only	
JP-4	V800, Z800			V600 only	
JP-3	F500, J300, K300, K500, K700, S700, Z500	JSR 184, Mascot Capsule Ver. 3			
JP-2	Z1010	Nokia UI API 1.1, JSR 135, JSR 120, JTWI (JSR 185), MIDP 2.0, CLDC 1.1			
JP-1	T610/T616/T618, T630/T628, Z600/Z608	MIDP 1.0, CLDC 1.0			

Note: JSR 184, Mascot Capsule Ver. 3 and JSR 234 are not enabled in Z310 series.
