= Mobile Service Architecture =

Mobile Service Architecture (MSA) JSR 248 is a specification that describes an end-to-end wireless environment for Java ME. MSA includes a full set of 16 JSRs and a subset of 8 JSRs:

== MSA Subset ==
The MSA Subset includes the following JSRs:

| JSR # | Specification or Technology |
|---|---|
| 75 | PDA Optional Packages for the J2ME Platform |
| 82 | Java APIs for Bluetooth |
| 118 | Mobile Information Device Profile (MIDP) 2.0 for Java ME |
| 135 | Java Mobile Media API (MMAPI) for Java ME |
| 139 | Connected Limited Device Configuration (CLDC) 1.1 for Java ME |
| 184 | Mobile 3D Graphics API for Java ME 1.0 and 1.1 |
| 205 | Wireless Messaging API 2.0 (WMA) 2.0 |
| 226 | Scalable 2D Vector Graphics API for J2ME |

== MSA ==
MSA includes the MSA Subset and the following JSRs:

| JSR # | Specification or Technology |
|---|---|
| 172 | Web Services Specification for Java ME |
| 177 | Security and Trust Services API for J2ME (SATSA) |
| 179 | Location API 1.0 for Java ME |
| 180 | Session Initiation Protocol (SIP) API for Java ME |
| 211 | Content Handler API (CHAPI) |
| 229 | Payment |
| 234 | Advanced Multimedia Supplements API for Java ME |
| 238 | Internationalization |

== See also ==
- MIDlet
