= PhoneME =

The phoneME project is Sun Microsystems reference implementation of Java virtual machine and associated libraries of Java ME with source, licensed under the GNU General Public License.

The phoneME library includes implementations of Connected Limited Device Configuration (CLDC) and Mobile Information Device Profile (MIDP) as well as complete or partial implementations for some optional package JSRs.

== Optional Java ME packages implementations ==
phoneME provide complete or partial implementations for the following JSRs:

- PDA Optional Packages for the J2ME Platform (JSR 75)
- Java APIs for Bluetooth (JSR 82)
- Wireless Messaging API|Wireless Messaging API and Wireless Messaging API 2.0 (JSR 120 and JSR 205)
- Java Mobile Media API (JSR 135)
- Web Services Specification for Java ME (JSR 172)
- Security and Trust Services API for J2ME (JSR 177)
- Location API for Java ME (JSR 179)
- Session Initiation Protocol (Java) (JSR 180)
- Content Handler API (JSR 211)
- Scalable 2D Vector Graphics API (JSR 226)
- Payment API (JSR 229)
- Mobile Internationalization API (JSR 238)
- Java Binding for OpenGL ES (JSR 239)

== Supported platforms ==
Supported platforms are Linux/ARM, Linux/x86 and Windows/i386.

== See also ==
- Java Platform, Micro Edition
