= Motorola A925 =

3G mobile phone from Motorola using Symbian OS

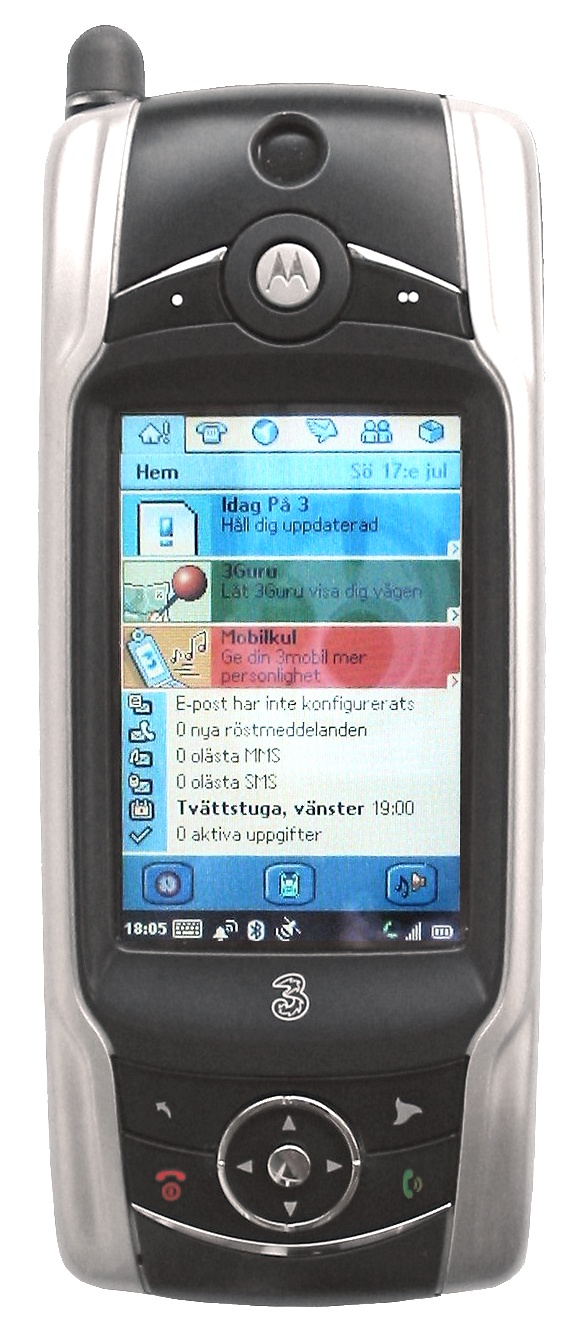
Motorola A925

Motorola A925 is a 3G mobile phone from Motorola using Symbian OS. Among the most notable features is its built-in A-GPS. The A925 was preceded by the featurewise essentially identical Motorola A920, and was succeeded by the Motorola A1000.

The A925 was developed jointly between Motorola and mobile network operator 3, and therefore was only available for purchase through 3. This also leading to it being SIM locked to 3, and the phone's software with branding possibilities related "3" and no official unbranded firmware available.

== Features ==
- Mobile phone technologies
  - UMTS
  - GSM 900, 1800 and 1900 MHz
  - GPRS
- Physical attributes
  - 148.5 × 60 × 24 mm
  - 212 g
- Hardware
  - ARM processor at 168 MHz
  - 32 MB RAM
  - 32 MB ROM
  - 12 MB internal user-accessible storage
  - Secure Digital card slot
  - A-GPS
  - Camera with up to 640 × 480 pixel still image size
  - USB connectivity to computers
  - Bluetooth
  - Infrared port
- Display
  - TFT LCD, touchscreen, handwriting recognition
  - 40 × 61 mm
  - 208 × 320 pixels
  - 16-bit color depth / 65536 colors
- Operating system
  - Symbian OS 7.0
  - UIQ 2.0 user interface
- Java
  - Java ME MIDP 1.0, CLDC 1.0
  - PersonalJava
