= JAD (file format) =

File format

JBook application descriptor
- Filename extension: .jad .jar
- Internet media type: text/vnd.sun.j2me.app-descriptor
- Developed by: Sun Microsystems, Inc.
- Type of format: Descriptor file
- Standard: Java application

Java Application Descriptor (JAD) files describe the MIDlets (Java ME applications) that are distributed as JAR files. JAD files are commonly used to package Java applications or games that can be downloaded to mobile phones. Java applications enable mobile phones to interact functionally with online web services, such as the ability to send SMS messages via GSM mobile Internet or interact in multiplayer games. Some BlackBerry devices use JAD files for themes, while on some mobile phones without memory cards it is not possible to download any apps.

Recent midlets contain a manifest file in the JAR archive. This file contains much of the information stored in the JAD file, rendering it unnecessary in most cases.

== JAD mime type ==
The MIDP2 specification instructs that web servers should serve JAD files with a MIME type of "text/vnd.sun.j2me.app-descriptor". If this MIME type is not correctly configured, many phones will fail to install the MIDlet.

== Example ==
Manifest-Version: 1.0
Created-By: Apache Ant 1.5.1
MIDlet-1: Book Reader by TC, br.BookReader
MIDlet-Name: BookReader
MIDlet-Vendor: tequilaCat
MIDlet-Version: 1.3.6
MicroEdition-Configuration: CLDC-1.0
MicroEdition-Profile: MIDP-1.0
MIDlet-Jar-Size: 24575
MIDlet-Jar-URL: bookreader.jar
TC-BookReader-Logging: true

== See also ==
- .sis
- Midp2
