= DoJa =

Java device platform

DoJa profile is a Java application environment specification for DoCoMo's i-mode mobile phone.

DoJa is based on the Java ME CLDC API that is defined in the Java Community Process (JCP). DoJa is a profile defined by NTT DoCoMo to provide communications and other input-output processing, user interface (GUI) and other application features/functions unique to i-mode, and extension libraries defined by individual phone terminal makers to add original functions. However, in contrast with other Java ME profiles like Mobile Information Device Profile (MIDP) or Information Module Profile (IMP), DoJa is not defined as a Java Specification Request (JSR), hence it is often called a "proprietary" Java ME profile.

DoJa allows i-mode to offer more dynamic and interactive content than conventional HTML-based i-mode content. Java for i-mode consists of support for a version of CLDC and a version of the DoJa profile. CLDC support can be 1.0 or 1.1 depending on the handset. The DoJa profile was originally created for the local Japanese market with version 1.0 and version 2.0 more or less corresponding to MIDP 1.0 and MIDP 2.0. For the market outside Japan a new API has been created, which is referred to as the Overseas Edition. Currently DoJa 1.5oe and DoJa 2.5oe are implemented on handsets sold in Europe. (The first DoJa handset with DoJa1.5oe is N341i launched in 2003 from NEC, and the first DoJa 2.5 handset is M430i launched in the beginning of 2005 from Mitsubishi.) The DoJa Profile provides for use with i-mode extension library (Java for i-mode profiles), including user interfaces and HTTP communications.

== DoJa Profiles ==
DoJa Profile	Japanese handsets	Java CLDC version	Maximum JAR size	Maximum scratchpad
DoJa-1.0	503, 2101, 2002 Series	1.0	10/30kb	10/30/50kb
DoJa-2.x	504, 2051, 2102, 2701 Series	1.0	30kb	100/200kb
DoJa-3.0	505, 506 Series	1.0	30kb	200kb
DoJa-3.5	900 Series	1.0	100kb	400kb
DoJa-4.0LE	700, 701, 702 Series	1.1	30kb	200kb
DoJa-4.0	901 Series	1.1	100kb	400kb
DoJa-4.1	902 Series	1.1	100kb	400kb
DoJa-5.0	903 Series	1.1	1MB JAR+Scratch	
Star-1.0	F-01A, etc., released 2008/Q4	1.1	2MB JAR+Scratch	
Star-1.1	released 2009	1.1	2MB JAR+Scratch	
Star-1.2	released 2009	1.1	2MB JAR+Scratch	
Star-1.3	released 2010	1.1	2MB JAR+Scratch	
Star-1.5	released 2011	1.1	2MB JAR+Scratch	
Star-2.0	released 2011	1.1	10MB JAR+Scratch	

"Star" is the successor to DoJa, rather than being part of it, with access to modern hardware and services such as the accelerometer.
