= JCP Executive Committee =

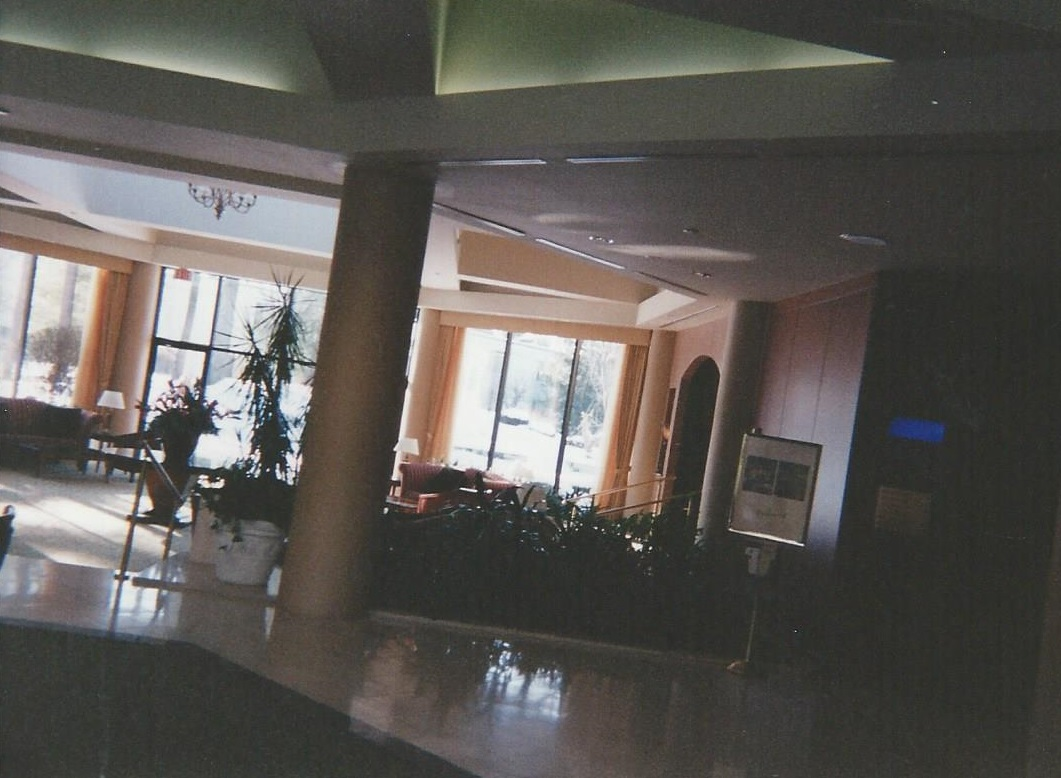
The JCP Executive Committee meeting of January 2001, as held in Bedford, Massachusetts

The JCP Executive Committee (EC) is the group of members guiding the evolution of Java technology in the Java Community Process (JCP). The EC represents both major stakeholders and a representative cross-section of the Java Community. It is composed of 16 JCP members plus a non-voting chair. The chair of the EC is a member of the Process Management Office (PMO). The 16 voting members are selected from JCP members.

The EC is responsible for approving the passage of specifications through key points of the JCP and for reconciling discrepancies between specifications and their associated test suites. There were originally two ECs: the SE/EE EC oversees the Java technologies for the desktop/server space (with responsibility for the Java SE and Java EE specifications) and the ME EC oversees the Java technologies for the consumer/embedded space (with responsibility for the Java ME specification).

The two ECs were merged in August 2012, with the passage of JSR 355. The current membership consists of large Java vendors, such as Oracle, IBM, HP, Fujitsu & Red Hat. Also represented are "end-user" companies, including Goldman Sachs, Credit Suisse & TOTVS. Two Java User Groups, SouJava and the London Java Community also hold seats, as does the Eclipse Foundation.

== Responsibilities ==
Each Executive Committee is expected to:

- Select Java Specification Requests (JSR) for development within the JCP.
- Approve draft specifications for public review.
- Give final approval to completed specifications and their associated Reference Implementations (RI) and Technology Compatibility Kits (TCK).
- Decide appeals of first-level TCK test challenges.
- Review maintenance revisions and possibly require some to be carried out in a new JSR.
- Approve transfer of maintenance duties between members.
- Provide guidance to the PMO.
