= Nokia 2651 =

Nokia cell phone

The Nokia 2651 is Nokia's first entry level clamshell phone. Although quite popular in the Latin American market, no large carriers in the US showed interest.

The 2651 did not include Bluetooth or a digital camera. It featured a 4,096 color LCD screen. The 2651 was the 2650's North American version.

== Specifications ==
Feature	Specification
Form factor	Clamshell
Operating system	Series 40 Version 1
GSM frequencies	850/1900 MHz
GPRS	Class 4 (3+1 slots), 24 - 36 kbit/s
EDGE (EGPRS)	None
UMTS/WCDMA (3G)	None
Main screen	CSTN Matrix,4096 colors, 128 x 128 pixels
Camera	No
Video recording	No
Multimedia Messaging	Yes
Video calls	No
Push to Talk over Cellular (PoC)	No
Java support	Yes, MIDP 1.0, CLDC 1.0
Built-in memory	977KB
Memory card slot	No
Bluetooth	No
Infrared	No
Data cable support	No
Browser	WAP 1.2.1 XHTML
Email	No
Music player	No
Radio	No
Video Player	No
Polyphonic tones	Yes, 4 channels, monophonic
MP3 ringtones	No
HF speakerphone	No
Offline mode	No
Battery	Li-Ion 760 mAh (BL-4C)
Talk time	3 Hours
Standby time	12+ days (300 hours)
Weight	96 grams
Dimensions	85 x 46 x 23 mm, 77 cc
Availability	Q2 2004
