= AMMS =

AMMS may refer to:

- Academy of Military Medical Sciences, China
- Advanced Multimedia Supplements
