= Information Module Profile =

IMP stands for the Information Module Profile. It is a specification put out by Sun Microsystems for the use of Java on embedded devices with very limited displays. It is a subset of the Mobile Information Device Profile.

IMP is part of the Java ME framework.

== Typical Requirements ==
- 128 kilobytes for the Java platform
- 8 kilobytes for persistent data
- 32 kilobytes for the Java runtime

== Noteworthy Limitations ==
- No API for displays

== General APIs ==
The core APIs are defined by the underlying Configuration CLDC.

=== javax.microedition.io ===
Contains the Java 2 Platform, Micro Edition specific classes used for I/O operations.

=== javax.microedition.rms ===
Provides a form of persistent storage for Java 2 Platform, Micro Edition.

=== javax.microedition.midlet ===
Contains the base classes for Java 2 Platform, Micro Edition applications.
