= Siemens SL45 =

Mobile phone by Siemens

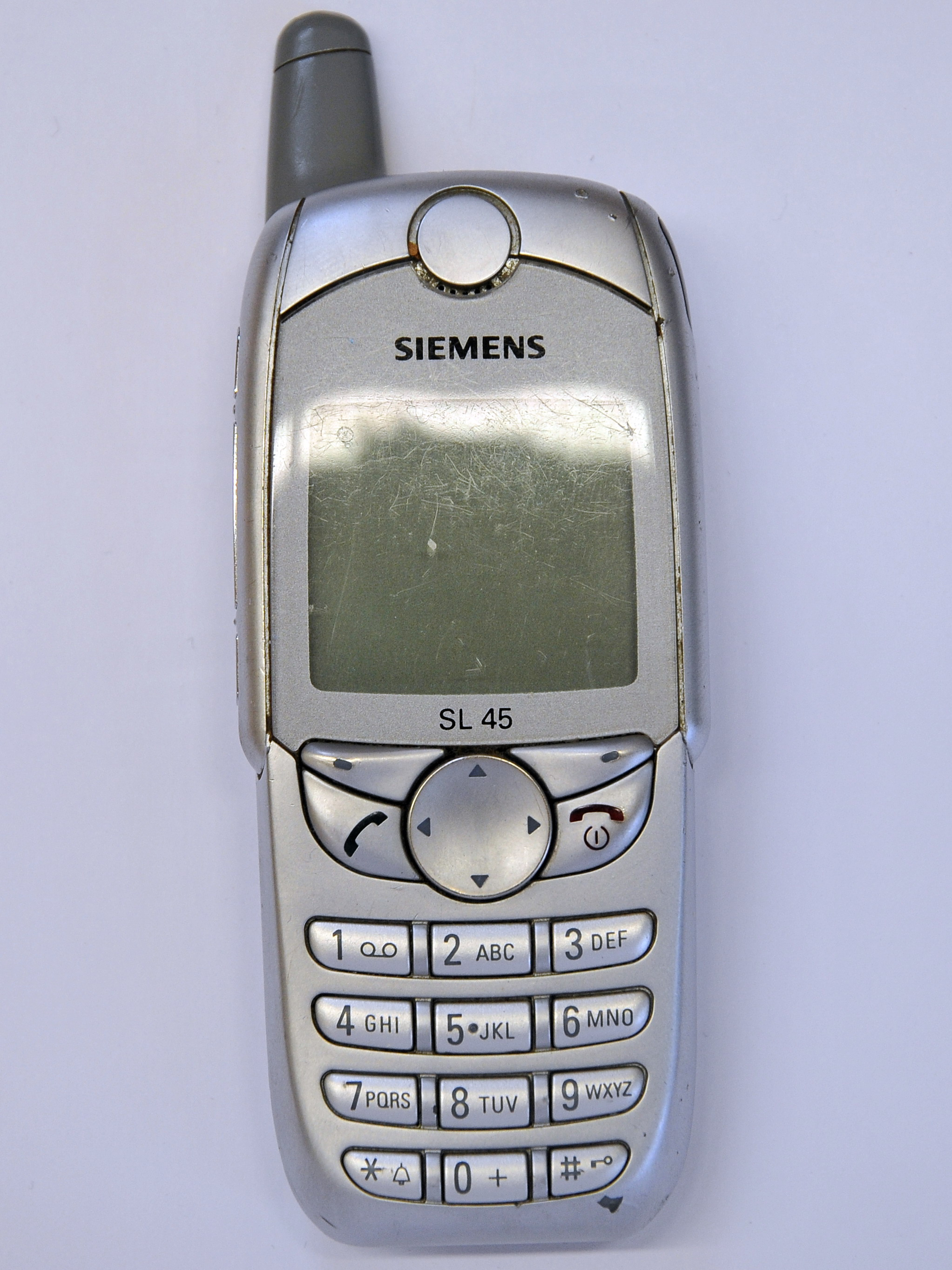
- An image of Siemens SL45
- Manufacturer: Siemens
- Availability by region: 2000 - 2006
- Compatible networks: GSM
- Dimensions: 105×46×17 mm (4.13×1.81×0.67 in)
- CPU: Siemens/Infineon C166
- Removable storage: Hot-Swappable MMC
- Battery: Lithium ion battery
- Display: 101 x 80 pixel, monochrome
- Connectivity: IrDA
- Data inputs: Keypad

The Siemens SL45 was the first mobile phone with memory expansion and an MP3 player, which debuted in late 2000. An improved version, the SL45i, was also the first phone to have a Java virtual machine.

In addition to the MP3 player, SL45 offered other advanced features such as dictaphone with several hours of recording time, auto responder, voice dialing and voice commands, WAP browser, and context sensitive help in several languages. Other software include calendar/organizer, alarm clock, stopwatch, calculator, currency converter and games. While the SL45 was one of the most advanced phones in its time, it was also one of the smallest.

== Versions ==
The Siemens SL45 came in three versions:

- Siemens SL45 - original edition, with a 32 MB memory card, sync station and stereo headphones in the package
- Siemens SL42 - a cheaper version introduced later, with a 16 MB memory card and no sync station or headphones
- Siemens SL45i - a version with a new firmware with Java support, and a slightly stronger battery

These three phones are electronically identical, and the SL45i's firmware can be installed in the SL42 and SL45, thus enhancing them with a Java virtual machine.

== Features and specifications ==
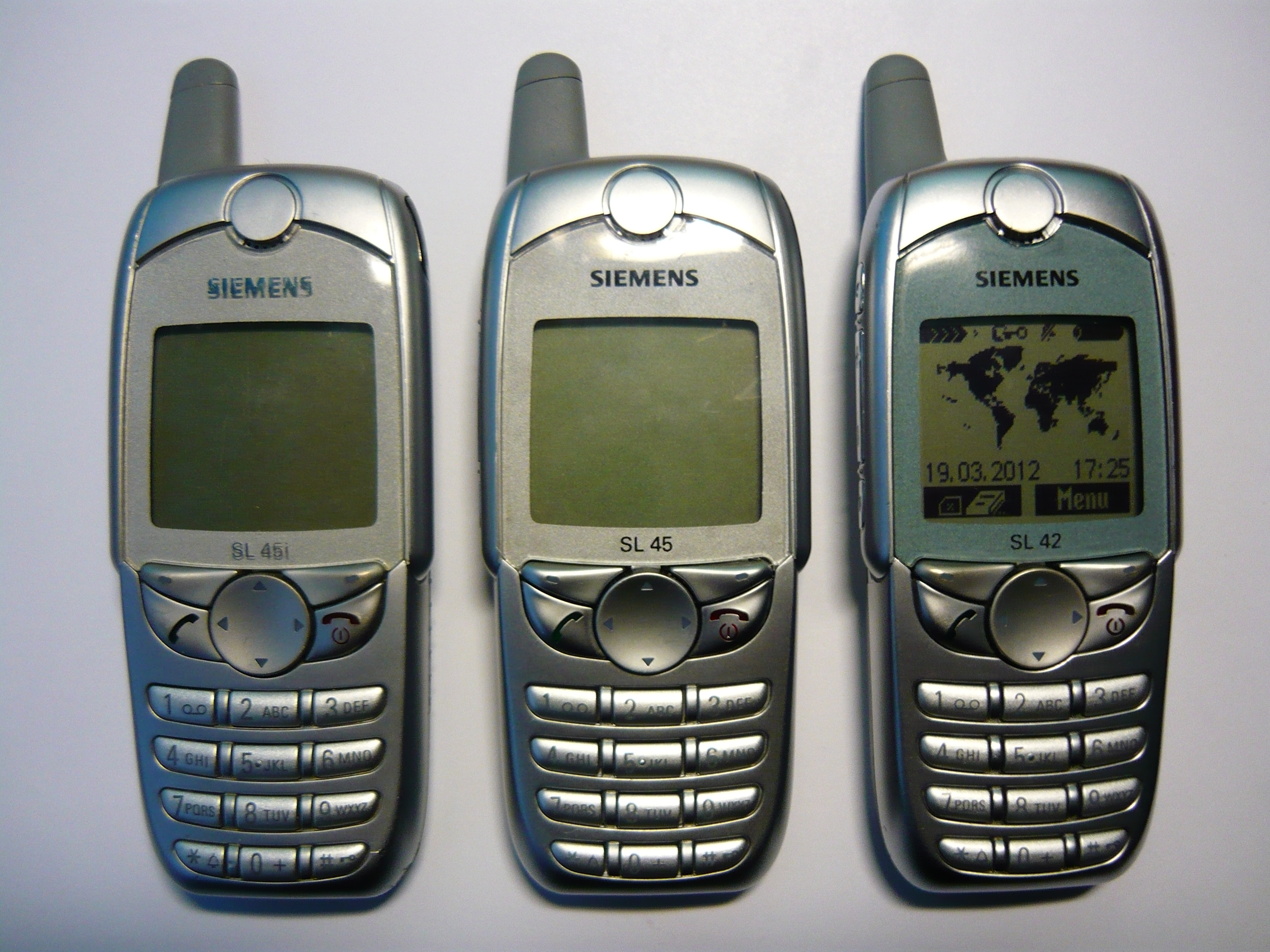
Siemens SL45i SL45 SL42

- Physical dimensions
  - Dimensions: 105 mm × 46 mm × 17 mm
  - Weight: 88 g
- Processor
  - Siemens/Infineon C166
    - 13 MHz during standard operation and MP3 playback
    - 26 MHz when Java midlet running
- Battery
  - Li-Ion 540 mAh (SL42 and SL45)
    - up to 170 hours of standby
    - up to approx. 5 hours of audio playback
    - up to 240 minutes of conversation
  - Li-Ion 650 mAh (SL45i)
    - up to 230 hours of standby
    - up to 330 minutes of conversation
- Communication
  - dual-band GSM: EGSM 900 MHz / GSM 1800 MHz
  - support for SMS sending and receiving
  - WAP 1.1 through CSD
  - CLID functionality
  - conference call support
- Memory
  - MultiMediaCard slot
  - 32 MB card included (SL45 and SL45i)
  - 16 MB card included (SL42)
  - known to work with at least 1 GB cards
- Display
  - graphic monochrome, 101 × 80 pixel
  - can contain up to 7 lines of text
  - orange backlight
- Sound
  - monophonic ringtone support
  - 39 standard ringtones
  - up to 3 custom ringtones in internal memory
  - ringtone composer
  - reads ringtones in standard MIDI file format from memory card
  - MP3 digital audio file player with ID3 tag support, through headset only
  - voice memo and voice notice
- Other features
  - personal information manager
  - address and phone book with up to 500 entries (plus SIM card capacity)
  - date and time functionality
  - stopwatch
  - alarm clock, reminder list
  - calculator
  - T9 system for SMS writing
  - vibration alert
  - up to 7 user-defined sound/vibration profiles
  - quick dial
  - voice dial
  - call filtering
  - 4 integrated games
  - 3 internal language versions + language files on memory card
  - Java functionality (SL45i firmware only)
    - Java ME/MIDP support
    - proprietary Siemens extensions
- Computer interoperability
  - Serial (COM) port
  - IrDA port
  - Microsoft Outlook synchronization

== Criticism ==
The SL45 series was a professional model and thus very highly priced at the time of release. It was sometimes criticized for its bugginess, particularly in that simply sending too many SMSs could cause the phone to crash, and for being relatively delicate - there are many known issues of vibration alert, or MP3 player control buttons on the side of the case stopping functioning after phone fall.

== Firmware ==
The SL42, SL45 and SL45i share the same electronic components, and thus firmware can be exchanged between them. It can enhance functionality of SL42 and SL45 with Java support. Relatively simple structure of the firmware code, and the ease of new firmware installation (standard serial cable included in the box is suitable) led to many custom firmware modifications (more than 300 patches) sprung over the Internet. These correct software bugs, change the phone's graphics, or even add new functionality like key remapping, calling pictures, or detailed battery information, and even up to 15 virtual SIM-cards (user must reboot phone to select virtual SIM from list).

== User base ==
Due to the above-mentioned firmware enhanceability, availability of many Java applications further enhancing the feature set (with, for example, sending of long SMS messages, e-book reading, video playing, and E-mail client functionality), MP3 player functionality and memory card slot, and also for being fairly priced after a few years since its release, the SL45 series gained a huge user base, constantly developing new firmware patches, Java applications and hardware modifications, enhancing the phone's functionality. Many fans of the model claim that there is no mobile phone which can replace the SL45i (either the original one, or SL42/45 enhanced with SL45i firmware) for them.

The phone is indeed very versatile and has a huge feature set, especially when compared to other phones of its time, although it lacks many features now considered standard for modern phones, like colour display, integrated camera, polyphonic or digitized ringtones, Bluetooth and GPRS functionality. Modern phones with memory card support also can be natively connected to a computer's USB port, greatly improving transfer speeds when compared to the SL45's serial connection; this limitation can be, however, omitted by using a third-party memory card reader.
