= Metadata facility for Java =

The Metadata Facility for Java is a specification for Java that defines an API for annotating fields, methods, and classes as having particular attributes that indicate they should be processed in specific ways by development tools, deployment tools, or run-time libraries.

The specification was developed under the Java Community Process as JSR 175, and was released as a part of J2SE 5.0 (Tiger).
