= MicroEmulator =

Emulation software

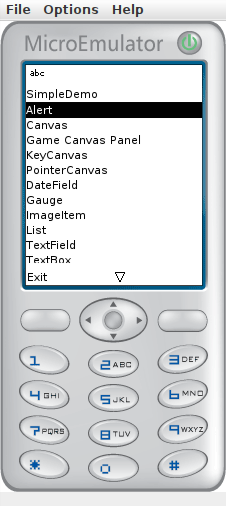
- Demo MIDlet running in MicroEmulator
- Other names: MicroEMU
- Original author: Bartek Teodorczyk
- Developers: Bartek Teodorczyk, Vlad Skarzhevskyy
- Release: March 31, 2006; 20 years ago
- Final release: 2.0.4 / January 14, 2010; 16 years ago
- Preview release: 3.0.0-SNAPSHOT.112 / May 24, 2013; 13 years ago
- Written in: Java
- Size: 1.1 MB
- Type: Emulator
- License: GNU Lesser General Public License version 2.1; Apache License version 2.0
- Website: microemu.org
- Repository: microemu on GitHub

MicroEmulator (also MicroEMU) — is a free and open-source platform independent J2ME emulator allowing to run MIDlets (applications and games) on any device with compatible JVM. It is written in pure Java as an implementation of J2ME in J2SE.

== History ==
In November 2001, MicroEmulator project was created on SourceForge.

On 31 March 2006, MicroEmulator version 1.0 was released.

In November 2009, project moved to code.google.com, and after Google closed it, development moved to GitHub.

On 10 January 2010, the last stable version 2.0.4 was released.

On 24 May 2013, the last preview version 3.0.0-SNAPSHOT.112 was released.

After 2014, MicroEMU technology was acquired by All My Web Needs company and all the MicroEmulator's docs and binary builds were removed from the official site.

All sources and binary previously released on SourceForge, Google Code and GitHub preserved as open-source, but development stalled since then.

== Ports and forks ==
=== Android ===
MicroEmulator has official support for the Android platform. It is also possible to convert J2ME MIDlet JAR-packages into standalone APK files.

J2ME Loader — is an enhanced fork of MicroEmulator for Android.

JL-Mod — is an enhaced fork of J2ME Loader with the Mascot Capsule 3D API support.

=== iOS ===
Microemulator on iPhone crosscompiled with XMLVM
- Working: List, Alert and TextBox
- Video by AtoroGM on YouTube

MicroEmulator has been ported to iOS, but it requires to use iOS jailbreaking technique to install it on iPhone or other iOS device.

=== Mac OS ===
MicroEmulator officially supports Mac OS, but there is also package in MacPorts repository.

== Usage ==
=== MicroEmulator as Opera Mini sandbox ===
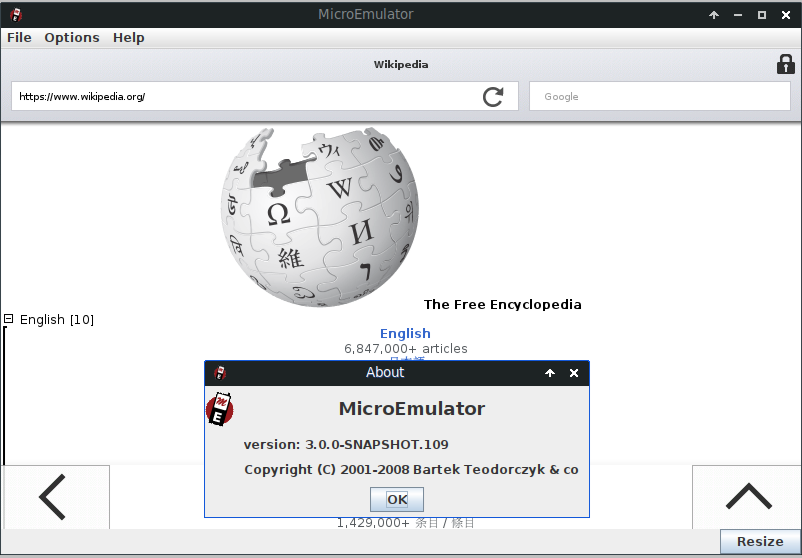
Wikipedia website in Opera Mini 8 browser running in MicroEmulator with full-screen Eee PC device skin

- Web applet with Opera Mini MIDlet running inside MicroEmulator has been placed on Opera official website.
- MicroEmulator used together with Opera Mini MIDlet to browse Internet via metered networks and slow mobile GPRS connection on netbooks (such as Asus Eee PC), low-end PCs and other mobile devices.
- In some countries mobile network operators provided free traffic or very lowcost plan with unlimited traffic for Opera Mini and some social networks and services via its J2ME clients (like Facebook, Yandex Maps, etc.). Use of MicroEmulator together with Opera Mini or other app with free traffic plan allowed to browse Internet fully free on PC (with USB modem attached) at home or on netbook on the go.

=== MicroEmulator as J2ME SDK ===
- MicroEmulator, together with few MIDlets for programming directly on phone (J2ME SDK Mobile, Mobile BASIC, MIDletPascal, etc.), could be used as a fully complete J2ME SDK: it is possible to write MIDlet source code, compile and preverify Java class files, package all files and resources of MIDlet project into JAR with JAD, and then run built MIDlet for test and debug without even leaving MicroEmulator window. The only external dependency is a JVM installed on PC or device to run Microemulator itself.
- MicroEmulator could be used as alternative to Sun's and Oracle's JavaME emulators for various desktop Java IDE's. For Eclipse, there was initially an open source bridge plugin known as EclipseME, but Eclipse 1.7 and onward got its own bridge plugin.
- MicroEmulator available as org.microemu plugin for Apache Maven build automation tool.

== Publications ==
- J2ME Building Blocks for Mobile Devices: White Paper on KVM and the Connected, Limited Device Configuration (CLDC) (PDF), Palo Alto, CA: Sun Microsystems, Inc., 19 May 2000
- Stefan, Haustein (14 July 2004), "ME4SE: A Pure Java Emulation of the Mobile Information Device Profile (MIDP)" (PDF), Siemens JavaTalks 2004 (Slides)
- Kroll, Michael (31 May 2007), J2ME Software Entwicklung und Fehlersuche (PDF) (Dipl.-Inf.(FH)) (in Swiss German), Michael Kroll Consulting & Solutions
- Smith, Micahel (2008), Browsers on the move: 2007-05 to 2008-06 (PDF) (Slides), W3C
- Tavares, Andre Luiz Camargos; Valente, Marco Tulio (2008-03-16). "A remote display system for Java-based mobile applications". Proceedings of the 2008 ACM symposium on Applied computing. ACM. pp. 1918–1922. doi:10.1145/1363686.1364150. ISBN 978-1-59593-753-7.
- Delwadia, Vipul (2009). RemoteME: Experiments in Thin-Client Mobile Computing (Thesis thesis). Victoria University (New Zealand).
- Virkus, Robert (18 September 2009). "Programming J2ME / Java ME Apps". Mobile Developer's Guide To The Galaxy (PDF). Bremen: Enough Software GmbH + Co. KG. pp. 14–22. Archived from the original (PDF) on 2 October 2009.
- Virkus, Robert (15 October 2009). "Programming J2ME / Java ME Apps". Mobile Developer's Guide To The Galaxy (PDF) (2nd Extended ed.). Bremen: Enough Software GmbH + Co. KG. pp. 21–29.
- Vávra, David (10 June 2009). GPS game for mobile framework Locify (PDF) (BA Thesis thesis). Czech Technical University in Prague.
- Fotouhi-Ghazvini, Faranak (20 March 2012), Mobile Learning using Mixed Reality Games and a Conversational, Instructional and Motivational Paradigm (PhD Thesis), University of Bradford
- Padmanaban, Yogesh (2013). Learning API mappings for programming platforms (Thesis). New Brunswick: Rutgers University - Graduate School.
- Gokhale, Amruta; Ganapathy, Vinod; Padmanaban, Yogesh (May 2013). "Inferring likely mappings between APIs". 2013 35th International Conference on Software Engineering (ICSE). pp. 82–91. doi:10.1109/ICSE.2013.6606554. ISBN 978-1-4673-3076-3.
- Virkus, Robert (February 2015). "Java ME (J2ME)". Mobile Developer's Guide To The Galaxy (15th ed.). Bremen: Enough Software GmbH + Co. KG. pp. 82–90. ASIN B00BS6RIKU. Archived from the original (PDF) on 29 September 2015.
- Phong, Cao, Porting J2ME Apps to Nokia X Using J2ME Android Bridge

== Video ==
- MicroEmu (J2ME emulation) on Linux on YouTube
- Alan Bazan. J2ME Emulator playlist on YouTube (in Spanish)

== See also ==
- SquirrelJME (JavaME 8 VM for embedded device)
- KEmulator (J2ME emulator for Windows)
- FreeJ2ME (J2ME emulator for Libretro and RetroArch)
- ME2SE (J2ME APIs for J2SE, runs on Windows Mobile)
- ScummVM
- DOSBox
- PyPy
- Python for S60
