= Sony Ericsson Aino =

Cell phone model

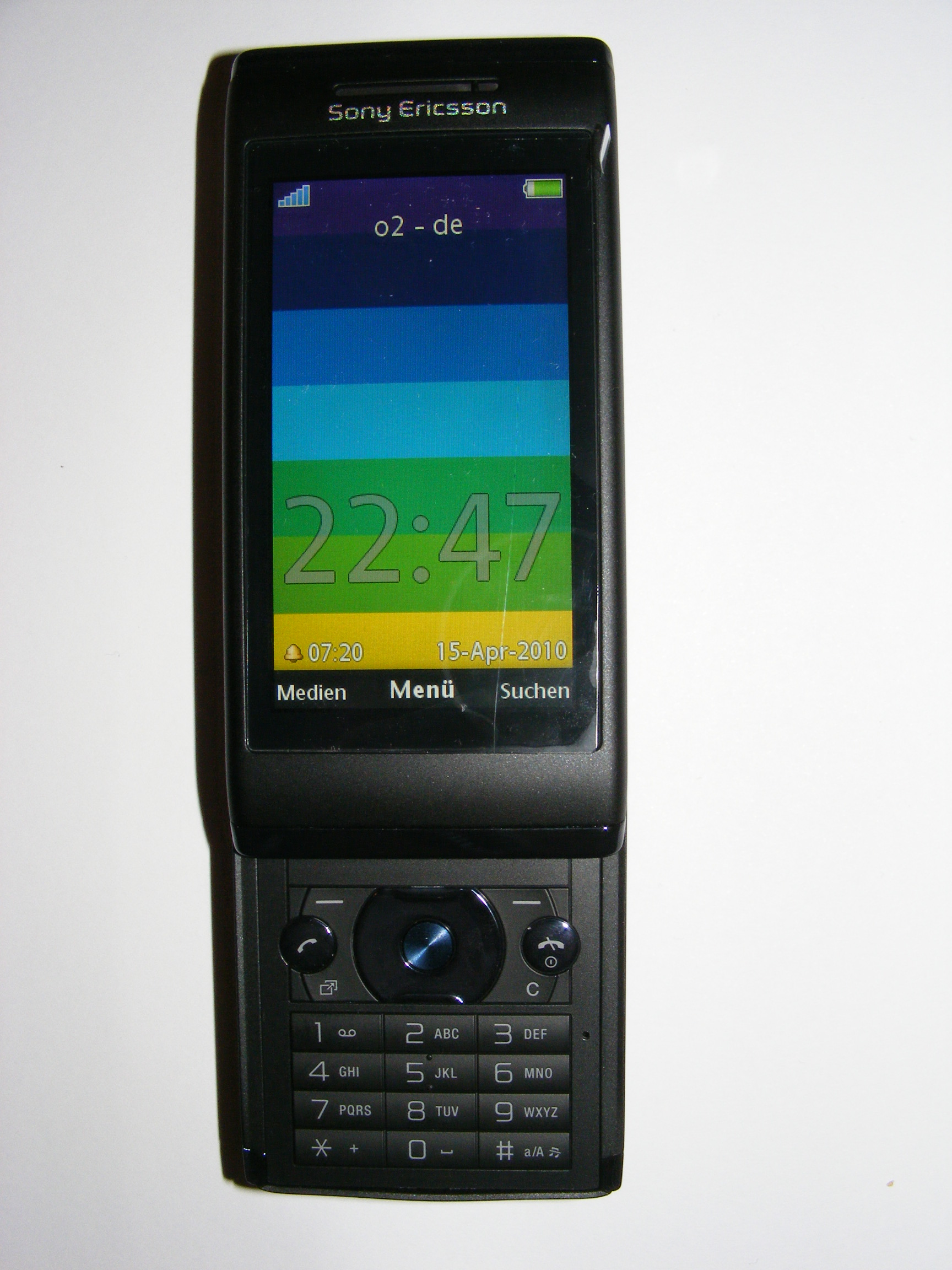
- Manufacturer: Sony Ericsson
- Availability by region: October 9, 2009
- Compatible networks: UMTS, GSM
- Form factor: Touchscreen slider
- Dimensions: 104 mm × 50 mm × 15.5 mm (4.09 in × 1.97 in × 0.61 in)
- Weight: 134.0 g (4.73 oz)
- Removable storage: microSDHC, up to 32 GB
- Battery: Li-Poly 1000 mAh
- Rear camera: 8.1-megapixel 16x digital zoom
- Display: 3-inch (76 mm) 240 × 432 TFT capacitive touchscreen with 16,777,216 colors
- Connectivity: 802.11b/g, Bluetooth, Wi-Fi (802.11b/g), DLNA, GPS receiver
- Other: NetFront web browser

Sony Ericsson Aino is a touch screen based slider mobile phone. It has a multimedia PlayStation 3-inspired touch menu (like XrossMediaBar), a large 3-inch (76 mm) touchscreen, VGA@30 FPS video recording. The 3-inch (76 mm) screen is touch-enabled but only in the multimedia part of the menu and the camera interface. Some third party applications like Opera-Mini also support the touch screen interface. It also has an 8.1-megapixel camera. The Aino uses NetFront 3.5 web browser for internet connectivity.

== Technical specifications ==
- Model: U10i
- General: GSM 850/900/1800/1900 MHz, UMTS 850/900/2100, GPRS/EDGE class 10, HSDPA 7.2 Mbit/s, No HSUPA
- Form factor: Touchscreen* slider
- Dimensions: 104 × 50 × 15.5 mm, 134 g
- Display: 3-inch 16M color LED display, 240 × 432 pixel resolution
- Memory: 55 MB integrated memory, hot-swappable microSD card slot (up to 32 GB)
- Operating system: Java Platform 8 (also known as A200 platform), running at 200 MHz
- UI: Proprietary Flash-based UI
- Still camera: 8-megapixel autofocus camera with LED flash, touch focus, geo-tagging, face detection, smile detection, image stabilizer, smart contrast
- Video recording: VGA video recording at 30 frame/s
- Connectivity: Wi-Fi, Bluetooth 2.0 with A2DP, GPS receiver with A-GPS support
- Misc: Partial touchscreen functionality, accelerometer for screen auto rotate, FM radio with RDS, Remote Play for PlayStation 3
- Battery: 1000 mAh battery

Touchscreen features are only accessible in with certain features of the phone.

== Features ==
=== Camera ===
- Camera - 8.1-megapixel
- Digital zoom - up to 16x
- Photo feeds
- Geo tagging
- Video stabiliser
- Video recording
- Red-eye reduction
- Video blogging
- Picture blogging
- Photo flash
- Image stabiliser
- Photo fix
- BestPic
- Face detection
- Touch focus
- Auto focus

=== Connectivity ===
- aGPS
- Bluetooth technology
- DLNA Certified
- Google Maps
- Modem
- PictBridge
- Remote Play
- Synchronisation
- USB mass storage
- USB support
- WiFi

=== Communication ===
- Video calling (Main camera)
- Vibrating Alert
- Bluetooth wireless headset
- Polyphonic ringtones

=== Internet ===
- Web feeds
- WAP 2.0 XHTML

=== Entertainment ===
- Radio - FM radio with RDS
- Tracker
- Walk Mate
- Video viewing
- Video streaming
- Java
- Motion gaming
- 3D games
- Media

=== Music ===
- Music tones - MP3, AAC
- TrackID
- Shake control
- SensMe
- PlayNow
- Stereo speakers
- Bluetooth stereo (A2DP)
- Album art
- Clear stereo
- Clear bass
- Media Player

== Remote Play ==
Like the Sony PSP, the Aino features PlayStation 3 connectivity, called Remote Play. This allows the phone to be able to turn the PS3 on from anywhere in the world and stream its media files. This is the first phone to implement this, as it was previously only available on PlayStation Portable.
