= Application Isolation API =

The Application Isolation API (JSR 121) provides a specification for isolating and controlling Java application life cycles within a single Java Virtual Machine (JVM) or between multiple JVMs. An isolated computation is described as an Isolate that can communicate and exchange resource handles (e.g. open files) with other Isolates through a messaging facility.
