= Connected Device Configuration =

Java ME application framework

The Connected Device Configuration (CDC) is a specification of a framework for Java ME applications describing the basic set of libraries and virtual-machine features that must be present in an implementation. The CDC is combined with one or more profiles to give developers a platform for building applications on embedded devices ranging from pagers up to set-top boxes. The CDC was developed under the Java Community Process as JSR 36 (CDC 1.0.2) and JSR 218 (CDC 1.1.2).

== Typical requirements ==
Devices that support CDC typically include a 32-bit CPU with about 2 MB of RAM, and 2.5 MB of ROM available for the Java application environment. The reference implementations for CDC profiles are based on Linux running on an Intel-compatible PC, and optimized implementations are available for a variety of other CPUs and operating systems.

== Profiles ==
A profile is a set of APIs that support devices with different capabilities and resources within the CDC framework to provide a complete Java application environment. Three profiles are available, which build on each other incrementally and allow application developers to choose the appropriate programming model for a particular device.

=== Foundation Profile ===
This is the most basic of the CDC family of profiles. Foundation Profile is a set of Java APIs tuned for low-footprint devices that have limited resources that do not need a graphical user interface system. It provides a complete Java ME application environment for consumer products and embedded devices but without a standards-based GUI system. Version 1.1.2 is specified in JSR 219 and implements a subset of Java SE 1.4.2, including a set of security-related optional packages, such as Java Authentication and Authorization Service (JAAS), Java Secure Socket Extension (JSSE), and Java Cryptography Extension (JCE).

=== Personal Basis Profile ===
The Personal Basis Profile provides a superset of the Foundation Profile APIs and supports a similar set of devices, with lightweight graphical user interface requirements. A framework for building lightweight graphical user interface components is provided with support for some AWT classes. There are no heavyweight GUI components provided because these components assume the availability of a pointing device such as a mouse. The specification is described in JSR 217 and is used for products that require a standards-based graphical user interface but without full AWT compatibility. The Xlet application programming model is used for application development within this profile, including advanced content on Blu-ray discs conforming to the BD-J specification.

=== Personal Profile ===
The Personal Profile extends the Personal Basis Profile with a GUI toolkit based on AWT. It provides a complete Java ME application environment with full AWT support and is intended for higher end devices, such as PDAs, smart communicators, set-top boxes, game consoles, automobile dashboard electronics, and so on. This is the recommended profile for porting of legacy PersonalJava-based applications. The specification is described in JSR 62 and uses the Applet programming model for application development.

== Optional Packages ==
CDC supports a number of optional packages that allow developers to access specific pieces of extra functionality within the restricted resource constraints of a Java ME device.

- The RMI Optional Package provides a subset of Java SE RMI for distributed-application and network communication.
- The JDBC Optional Package provides a subset of the JDBC 3.0 API for accessing data sources, including spreadsheets, flat files and relational databases.

== See also ==
- Connected Limited Device Configuration or CLDC, another framework for building Java ME applications
