= Jakarta Management =

Jakarta Management (formerly J2EE Management) is a Java specification request (JSR-77) for standardization of Jakarta EE server management. Jakarta Management abstracts the manageable parts of the Jakarta EE architecture and defines an interface for accessing management information. This helps system administrators integrate Jakarta EE servers into a system management environment and also helps application developers create their own management tools from scratch.

The goal of JSR 77 is to abstract the fundamental manageable aspects of the Jakarta EE architecture to provide a well defined model for implementing instrumentation and information access. In addition, this specification defines a standardized API for inter-operating with Jakarta EE components that participate in the monitoring and control of the platform’s resources.

The implementation of the JSR-77 for enterprise applications is done by the application server and for web modules it is done by the web container.

Jakarta Management was removed from Jakarta EE 9.

== Overview ==
The Jakarta Management model is a specification of the attributes, operations and architecture of the managed objects required by compliant Jakarta EE platform implementations. The model is designed to be interoperable with a variety of industry standard management systems and protocols.

The Management EJB (MEJB) component provides interoperable remote access of the model to Jakarta EE application components. All compliant implementations must support the MEJB component. This specification also provides standard mappings of the model to the CIM/WBEM Common Information Model (CIM) and the SNMP Management Information Base (MIB). Further, implementation support for SNMP and CIM/WBEM is optional.

Latest version of this JSR is 1.1 released on 8 May 2006.
