= Sony Ericsson C702 =

Mobile phone model

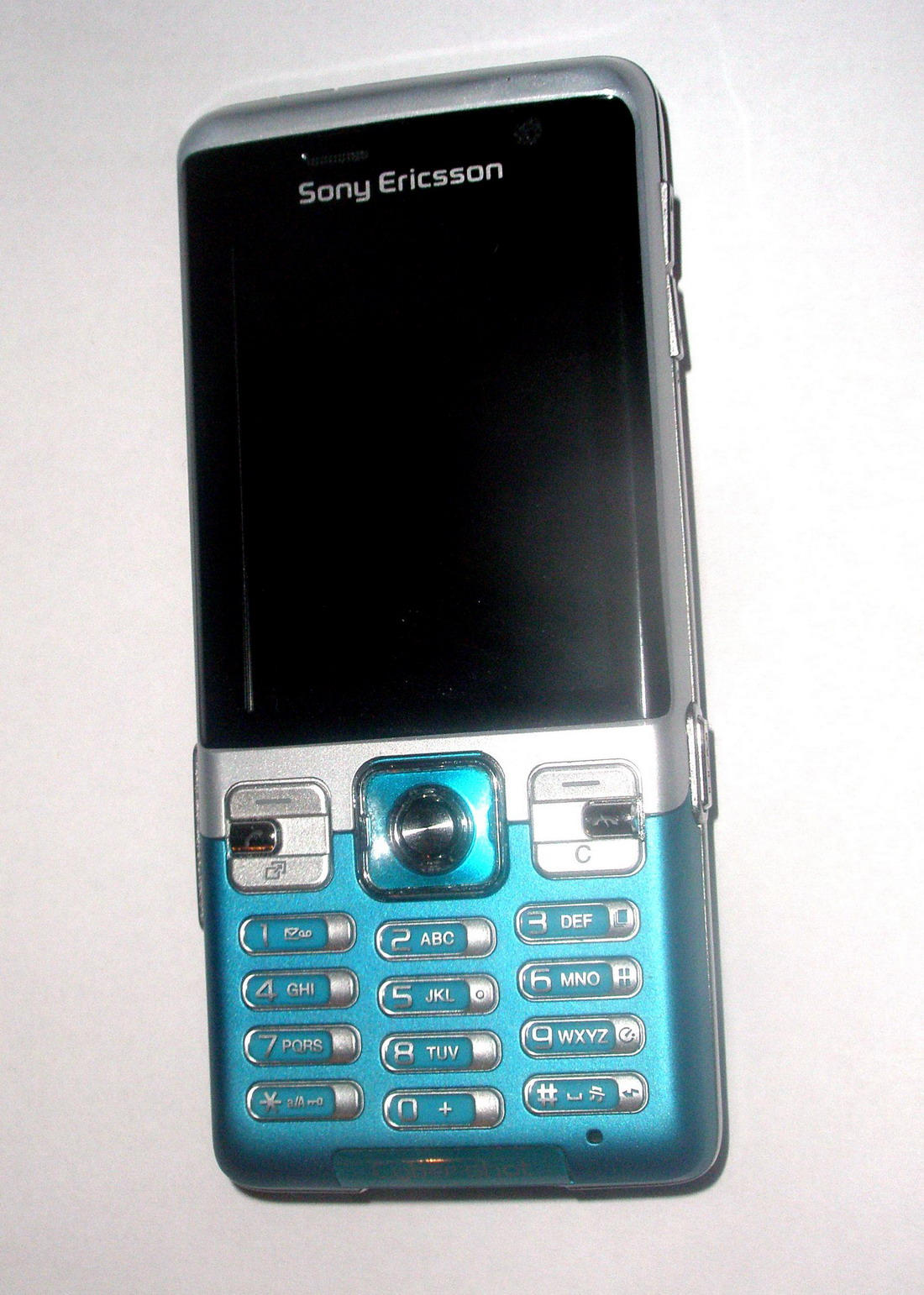
- Manufacturer: Sony Ericsson
- Series: C-series
- First released: June 2008
- Compatible networks: GSM 850 / 900 / 1800 / 1900; GPRS Class 10 (4+1/3+2 slots), 32 - 48 kbit/s EDGE Class 10, 236.8 kbit/s HSDPA 3.6 Mbit/s; UMTS 2100
- Dimensions: 106 mm (4.2 in) H 48 mm (1.9 in) W 15.5 mm (0.61 in) D
- Weight: 105 g (3.7 oz)
- Storage: 160 MB Internal
- Removable storage: Memory Stick Micro (M2) slot (up to 4 GB)
- Battery: Standard battery, Li-Ion 950 mAh (BST-33)
- Rear camera: 3.2 MP (2048×1536 px max.); Autofocus; QVGA at 30 fps
- Front camera: QCIF videocall camera
- Display: TFT LCD, 2.2 in (56 mm) diagonal 240x320 px 256K colors (~182 ppi pixel density)
- Connectivity: Bluetooth v2.0 with A2DP; FM stereo receiver (certain variants); USB
- Data inputs: A-GPS; Microphone; Push buttons
- SAR: 1.00 W/kg (head)

Sony Ericsson C702 is a camera-focused feature phone manufactured by Sony Ericsson released in June 2008. The phone features a 3.2-megapixel digital camera with LED flash and a few features such as geo-tagging and face detection. On the entertainment front, the phone has a media player supporting MP3, AAC/AAC+/eAAC+ and WMA music files and 3GP/MPEG-4 video files. The phone also features a RDS FM radio, and a Memory Stick Micro (M2) slot for expandable solid state memory (up to 16GB theoretically - officially up to 4 GB)

As with many other phones in the C-series, this phone also has several different versions. The C702i is the international version (thus the i) and it supports GSM/GPRS/EDGE 850 / 900 / 1800 / 1900 and UMTS / HSDPA 2100 network and the C702c (China Mainland version) and C702a (American version) only support GSM 850/900/1800/1900 MHz. Since the C702i does support 3G (and HSDPA or sometimes called 3G+), it comes with a QCIF (176X144) resolution front-mounted camera for 3G video conferencing. According to the official Sony Ericsson specifications, the C702's talk time drops steeply from around 6 hours 30 minutes when using GSM to about 2 hours 30 minutes whilst using UMTS.

== Technical specifications ==
=== Imaging ===
- 3.2-megapixel digital camera with auto-focus and Macro mode
- LED flash
- Shutter button with auto-focus (press half-way to auto-focus, fully to capture)
- Panorama - takes 3 VGA images of a landscape and then puts them into one picture
- Geo-tagging - adds the information about where the pictures were taken.
- Burst - takes 4 successive images of the same subject in VGA resolution to choose the best shot(s)
- QCIF (176x144) resolution video recording at 15 frames per second in 3GP format

=== Network ===
- Dual-mode: UMTS / HSDPA at 2100 MHz, and GSM/GPRS/EDGE at 850 MHz, 900 MHz, 1800 MHz and 1900 MHz.

=== Price ===
Around $200.

=== Entertainment ===
- Media play with Equalizer, Stereo Widening and MegaBass™
- MP3, WMA, RealAudio 8 and AAC/AAC+/eAAC+ audio
- MP4 and 3GP
- RDS FM radio
- MusicDJ, PhotoDJ and VideoDJ
- Sound recorder (saves records in AMR format)
- Streaming audio/video
- 3D Java games
- FaceWarp (pre-installed Java Application, not in all models)
- Remote Control application allows you to use your phone as a Human interface device (like mouse or keyboard) via Bluetooth. Three button presets available: Presenter, MediaPlayer, Desktop. Supported on host computer natively by Bluetooth stack (vendor-independent).

=== Internet ===
- Access NetFront - Full HTML browser
- Download Manager
- Native RSS Reader
- Email (POP3 and IMAP4). With Push e-mail available for IMAP4.

=== Connectivity ===
- Bluetooth 2.0 + A2DP
- CSD
- HSDPA
- GPRS
- EDGE
- USB 2.0 Synchronization or Mass Storage Device Transfer Mode via Fast Port connector
- GPS

=== Storage ===
- (M2) (Card not included as standard, up to 4 GB supported officially - unofficially up to 16 GB)
- Up to 160 MB Internal Flash memory

=== Dimensions ===
- 106.0 × 48.0 × 16.0 mm / 4.2 × 1.9 × 0.6 inches

=== Display ===
- 2.2 inch QVGA (240x320) TFT LCD
- 262,144 color TFT display

=== Colors ===
- Cool Cyan
- Speed Black
- Energy Black

=== Specific absorption rate (SAR) ===
- 1.00 W/kg (right)
