= Security and Trust Services API for J2ME =

The Security and Trust Services API for J2ME (SATSA), also known as JSR 177, is a collection of optional Java ME packages that extend the security capabilities of the Java 2 Platform, Micro Edition. It provides cryptographic functions, digital signature services, user credential management, and the ability for a Java ME application (typically a MIDlet) to communicate with a Security Element (most commonly a smart card such as a SIM/UICC or a dedicated Java Card).

SATSA was developed through the Java Community Process and reached Final Release in September 2004. It remains in Maintenance status. It is an optional feature of the Java ME platform (primarily targeted at CLDC/MIDP devices, though it can also be used with CDC) and was never mandated on all handsets.

== Purpose and features ==
The original Java ME platform offered only limited security primitives. SATSA addresses this by enabling:

- Secure storage and execution of sensitive operations inside a hardware Security Element
- Communication between a MIDlet and a smart card application
- Cryptographic operations (message digests, symmetric/asymmetric ciphers, and signature verification)
- Application-level digital signatures conforming to the Cryptographic Message Syntax (CMS)
- Basic user credential and certificate management

Typical use cases include mobile commerce and payment, user authentication and non-repudiation, digital rights management, access to corporate networks, ticketing, and loyalty applications.

== Components ==
JSR 177 defines four independent optional packages. A device may implement any combination of them.

=== SATSA-APDU ===
Provides low-level communication with a smart card using APDUs as defined by ISO/IEC 7816-4. The main interface is javax.microedition.apdu.APDUConnection, which is obtained through the Generic Connection Framework.

Connections are opened with a locator of the form: apdu:<slot>;target=<AID> (for example apdu:0;target=a0.00.00.00.62.03.01.0c.02.01).

The primary method is exchangeAPDU(byte[] command), which sends a command APDU and returns the response APDU. Implementations may also support communication with the (U)SIM Application Toolkit (SAT) by using the special target SAT.

=== SATSA-JCRMI ===
Offers a higher-level alternative to APDU by allowing a MIDlet to invoke methods on remote objects that reside on a Java Card. It is based on Java Card Remote Method Invocation (JC RMI). The connection interface is javax.microedition.jcrmi.JavaCardRMIConnection.

=== SATSA-PKI ===
Enables application-level digital signatures and basic certificate management. The two main classes are:

- javax.microedition.securityservice.CMSMessageSignatureService — generates CMS-formatted signatures (RFC 2630 / RFC 2634). It supports both authentication and non-repudiation signatures and can include the signed content and/or the signer’s certificate.
- javax.microedition.pki.UserCredentialManager — manages user credentials (adding/removing certificates or certificate URIs and generating certificate signing requests).

These operations typically involve interaction with the Security Element (PIN entry, card insertion prompts, etc.).

=== SATSA-CRYPTO ===
A subset of the Java Cryptography Architecture (JCA) / Java Cryptography Extension (JCE) suitable for constrained devices. It provides:

- Message digests (java.security.MessageDigest)
- Signature verification (java.security.Signature)
- Symmetric and asymmetric ciphers (javax.crypto.Cipher)
- Key and algorithm parameter specifications

It does not include key generation or full signature creation on the device itself (those are handled by SATSA-PKI when a Security Element is used).

== Implementation and support ==
SATSA was never a mandatory part of the Java ME platform. Device manufacturers could include it when required. Manufacturers that shipped phones with SATSA support (at least on selected models) included:

- Motorola
- Nokia (from Series 40 onwards, on a selective basis)
- Samsung
- Sony Ericsson (from Java Platform JP-8 onwards)

Oracle (formerly Sun Microsystems) provided a Reference Implementation bundled with the CLDC 1.0.4 and MIDP 2.0 RIs, as well as full SATSA support in the Java ME SDK and Wireless Toolkit emulators. In the emulator, smart-card slots are simulated via the Java Card Platform Simulator (cref) over TCP ports (commonly 9025 and 9026).

Access control is enforced through permission files that can restrict which MIDlet suites are allowed to open specific APDU or JCRMI connections, and which PIN or cryptographic operations they may perform.

== Packages ==
The main packages defined or subsetted by SATSA include:

- javax.microedition.apdu
- javax.microedition.jcrmi
- javax.microedition.pki
- javax.microedition.securityservice
- Subsets of java.security, java.security.spec, javax.crypto, javax.crypto.spec, and selected Java Card packages for exception types.

== Status ==
JSR 177 reached Final Release in September 2004 and has remained in Maintenance status since then. With the decline of feature-phone Java ME and the rise of smartphones with stronger native security frameworks (and later the shift toward Java Card and GlobalPlatform-based secure elements), SATSA saw limited long-term adoption outside of specialized mobile payment and SIM-related applications of the mid-2000s.

== See also ==
- Java Card
- Java ME
- Application protocol data unit
- Public key infrastructure
- Digital signature
