= PDA Optional Packages for the J2ME Platform =

PDA Optional Packages for the J2ME Platform JSR 75 is a specification that standardizes access in the Java on embedded devices such as mobile phones and PDAs to data that resides natively on mobile devices. JSR 75 is part of the Java ME framework and sits on top of CLDC, a set of lower level programming interfaces. It has 2 main components. Not all devices that claim to implement JSR 75 will implement both components.

== See also ==
- MIDlet
