= MIDlet =

Java ME application format

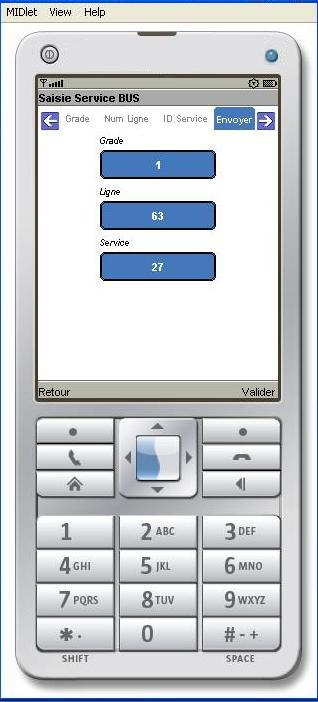
MIDlet running in J2ME emulator

A MIDlet is an application that uses the Mobile Information Device Profile (MIDP) of the Connected Limited Device Configuration (CLDC) for the Java ME environment. Typical applications include games running on mobile devices such as smartphones with J2ME support and feature phones which have small graphical displays, simple numeric keypad interfaces and limited network access over HTTP.

The .jad file describing a MIDlet suite is used to deploy the applications in one of two ways. Over the air (OTA) deployment involves uploading the .jad and .jar files to a Web server which is accessible by the device over HTTP. The user downloads the .jad file and installs the MIDlets they require. Local deployment requires that the MIDlet files be transferred to the device over a non-network connection (such as through Bluetooth or IrDa, and may involve device-specific software). Phones that support microSD cards can sometimes install .jar or .jad files that have been transferred to the memory card.

== Platforms ==
Mainly MIDlet applications and games developed for Series 40, Series 60, Nokia Asha and Sony Ericsson Java Platform.

== Emulation ==
MIDlet can run using MicroEmulator app on any desktop PC with JavaSE and on Maemo. On Android devices via the J2ME Loader (MicroEmulator fork) application.

Other J2ME emulators also could be used with or without some limitations.

== Restrictions ==
Unlike a Java applet, a MIDlet is limited to use of the LCDUI rather than the more familiar widgets of AWT and Swing. There are also restrictions on the size of .jar files and the number of concurrent HTTP connections based on the MIDP specification.

== See also ==
- Mobile Information Device Profile
- Connected Limited Device Configuration
