= PersonalJava =

Java edition for mobile and embedded systems

- Player software: Java
- Programming language(s): Java
- Application(s): Embedded systems, mobile devices
- Status: Inactive
- License: Proprietary licence by Sun
- Website: java.sun.com/products/personaljava/ (Inactive)

PersonalJava was a Java edition for mobile and embedded systems based on Java 1.1.8. It has been superseded by the CDC's Personal Profile, which is not widely deployed.
