= Java Community Process =

Professional organization

The Java Community Process (JCP), established in 1998, is a formal mechanism that enables interested parties to develop standard technical specifications for Java technology. Becoming a member of the JCP requires solid knowledge of the Java programming language, its specifications, and best practices in software development. Membership in the JCP involves a detailed review of the candidate's profile, including an assessment by current members. Typically, professionals are invited to join the JCP based on their contributions and reputation within the Java community.

Once invited, the new member undergoes an evaluation by the JCP Executive Committee, ensuring that they can effectively contribute to the Java Specification Requests (JSRs). These formal documents describe proposed specifications and technologies to be added to the Java platform. New members are encouraged to engage actively and play a crucial role in supporting the Java community and its releases. It is essential that members possess expertise and in-depth technical knowledge, combined with strong professional experience, to significantly contribute to the growth and usage of the Java language.

Membership for organizations and commercial entities requires annual fees, but it is free for individuals. JSRs undergo formal public reviews before becoming final, and the JCP Executive Committee votes on their approval. A finalized JSR provides a reference implementation, which is a free implementation of the technology in source code form, and a Technology Compatibility Kit to verify the API specification.

The JCP itself is described by a JSR. As of 2020, JSR 387 describes the current version (2.11) of the JCP.

== List of JSRs ==
There are hundreds of JSRs. Some of the more visible JSRs include:

JSR #	Specification or Technology	Reference implementations	Other implementations
1	Real-Time Specification for Java (RTSJ) 1.0		
3	Java Management Extensions (JMX) 1.0, 1.1, & 1.2		
5	Java API for XML Processing (JAXP) 1.0		
8	OSGI Open Services Gateway Specification		
9	Jiro (Federated Management Architecture Specification) 1.0		
12	Java Data Objects (JDO) 1.0		
13	Improved BigDecimal (Java Platform, Standard Edition#java.math)		
14	Add Generic Types To The Java Programming Language (as of J2SE 5.0)		
16	Java EE Connector Architecture (JCA) 1.0		
19	Enterprise JavaBeans (EJB) 2.0		
22	JAIN SLEE API Specification (JSLEE) 1.0		
30	Connected Limited Device Configuration (CLDC) 1.0 for Java ME		
31	Java Architecture for XML Binding (JAXB) 1.0		
32	JAIN SIP API Specification (JSIP) 1.0, 1.1 and 1.2 for Java ME		
36	Connected Device Configuration (CDC) 1.0 for Java ME		
37	Mobile Information Device Profile (MIDP) 1.0 for Java ME		
40	Java Metadata Interface (JMI) 1.0		
41	A Simple Assertion Facility (as of J2SE 1.4)		
47	Logging API Specification (as of J2SE 1.4)		
48	WBEM Services Specification (as of J2SE 1.4)		
51	Non-blocking I/O (NIO) (as of J2SE 1.4)	Grizzly, Netty	
52	JavaServer Pages Standard Tag Library (JSTL) 1.0 and 1.1		
53	Java Servlet 2.3 and JavaServer Pages (JSP) 1.2 Specifications		
54	Java Database Connectivity (JDBC) 3.0		
56	Java Network Launching Protocol and API (JNLP) 1.0, 1.5 and 6.0 (Java Web Start)		
58	Java 2 Platform, Enterprise Edition (J2EE) 1.3		
59	Java 2 Platform, Standard Edition (J2SE) 1.4 (Merlin)		
63	Java API for XML Processing (JAXP) 1.1 and 1.2		
68	Java Platform, Micro Edition (Java ME) 1.0		
73	Java Data Mining API (JDM) 1.0		
75	PDA Optional Packages for the J2ME Platform		
77	J2EE Management		
80	Java USB API		
82	Java APIs for Bluetooth		
88	Java EE Application Deployment		
91	OSS Trouble Ticket API		
93	Java API for XML Registries (JAXR) 1.0		
94	Java Rules Engine API		
102	Java Document Object Model (JDOM) 1.0		
110	Java APIs for WSDL (WSDL4J) 1.0		
112	Java EE Connector Architecture (JCA) 1.5		
113	Java Speech API 2 (JSAPI2)		
114	Java Database Connectivity (JDBC) Rowset Implementations		
116	SIP Servlet API 1.0		
118	Mobile Information Device Profile (MIDP) 2.0 for Java ME		
120	Wireless Messaging API (WMA)		
121	Application Isolation API		
127	JavaServer Faces (JSF) 1.0 and 1.1		
133	Java Memory Model and Thread Specification Revision		
135	Java Mobile Media API (MMAPI) for Java ME		
139	Connected Limited Device Configuration (CLDC) 1.1 for Java ME		
140	Service Location Protocol (SLP) API for Java		
141	Session Description Protocol (SDP) API for Java		
151	Java 2 Platform, Enterprise Edition (J2EE) 1.4		
152	JavaServer Pages (JSP) 2.0		
153	Enterprise JavaBeans (EJB) 2.1		
154	Java Servlet 2.4 and 2.5 Specifications		
160	Java Management Extensions (JMX) Remote API 1.0		
163	Java Platform Profiling Architecture (JPPA), which includes (among other specifications) the specification of Java Virtual Machine Tools Interface		
166	Concurrency Utilities (as of J2SE 5.0 java.util.concurrent, java.util.concurrent.atomic and java.util.concurrent.locks)		
168	Portlet specification 1.0		
170	Content repository API for Java (JCR) 1.0		
172	Web Services Specification for Java ME		
173	StAX (Streaming API for XML)		
175	A Metadata Facility for the Java Programming Language		
176	Java 2 Platform, Standard Edition (J2SE) 5.0 (Tiger)		
177	Security and Trust Services API for J2ME (SATSA)		
179	Location API 1.0 for Java ME		
180	Session Initiation Protocol (SIP) API for Java ME		
181	Web Services Metadata for the Java Platform		
184	Mobile 3D Graphics API for Java ME 1.0 and 1.1		
185	Java Technology for the Wireless Industry (JTWI)		
187	Instant messaging (Java ME and Java SE)		
198	A Standard Extension API for Integrated Development Environments		
199	Java Compiler API		
200	Pack200 Network Transfer Format for Java Archives		
201	Extending the Java Programming Language with Enumerations, Autoboxing, Enhanced for loops and Static Import (as of J2SE 5.0)		
202	Java Class File Specification Update		
203	More Non-blocking I/O (Java) (NIO2)		
204	Unicode Supplementary Character Support (as of J2SE 5.0 adds support for Unicode 3.1)		
205	Wireless Messaging API 2.0 (WMA) 2.0		
206	Java API for XML Processing (JAXP) 1.3		
208	Java Business Integration (JBI) 1.0		
211	Content Handler API		
215	Java Community Process (JCP) 2.6		
218	Connected Device Configuration (CDC) 1.1 for Java ME		
219	Foundation Profile 1.1		
220	Enterprise JavaBeans (EJB) 3.0		
221	Java Database Connectivity (JDBC) 4.0		
222	Java Architecture for XML Binding (JAXB) 2.0		
223	Scripting for the Java Platform for Java SE 6		
224	Java API for XML Web Services (JAX-WS), successor of JAX-RPC		
225	XQuery API for Java (XQJ)		
226	Scalable 2D Vector Graphics API for Java ME		
229	Payment API (PAPI)		
231	Java Bindings for OpenGL		
234	Advanced Multimedia Supplements API for Java ME		
235	Service Data Objects (SDO)		
239	Java Bindings for OpenGL ES		
240	JAIN SLEE API Specification (JSLEE) 1.1		
241	The Groovy Programming Language		
243	Java Data Objects (JDO) 2.0		
244	Java Platform, Enterprise Edition (Java EE) 5		
245	JavaServer Pages (JSP) 2.1		
247	Java Data Mining API (JDM) 2.0		
248	Mobile Service Architecture		
249	Mobile Service Architecture 2		
250	Common Annotations for the Java Platform (for the Metadata facility for Java)		
252	JavaServer Faces (JSF) 1.2		
253	Mobile Telephony API (MTA)		
255	Java Management Extensions (JMX) 2.0		
256	Mobile Sensor API		
257	Contactless Communication API (NFC)		
260	Javadoc Tag Technology Update		
269	Pluggable Annotations Processing API (for the Metadata facility for Java)		
270	Java Platform, Standard Edition (Java SE) 6 (Mustang)		
271	Mobile Information Device Profile (MIDP) 3.0 for Java ME		
274	The BeanShell Scripting Language		
275	Units specification (see Units of Measurement)		
276	Design-time Metadata for JavaServer Faces Components		
277	Java Module System		
280	XML API for Java ME		
281	IMS Services API (See IMS)		
282	Real-Time Specification for Java (RTSJ) 1.1		
283	Content repository API for Java (JCR) 2.0		
286	Portlet Specification 2.0		
289	SIP Servlet API 1.1		
290	Java Language & XML User Interface Markup Integration (XML-UI)		
291	Dynamic Component Support for Java SE (see OSGi)		
292	Supporting Dynamically Typed Languages on the JavaTM Platform		
293	Location API 2.0 for Java ME		
294	Improved Modularity Support in the Java Programming Language		
296	Swing Application Framework (Java SE 7)		
299	Contexts and Dependency Injection for the Java EE platform (CDI)	Weld	OpenWebBeans
301	JSF Portlet Bridge		
303	Bean Validation	Hibernate Validator	
307	Network Mobility and Mobile Data API (not official as of July, 20th, 2007 but official release is planned for 2. Q. 2008		
308	Annotations on Java Types (Java SE 8)		
311	JAX-RS: The Java API for RESTful Web Services (1.0 and 1.1)		
314	JavaServer Faces (JSF) 2.0	Mojarra JavaServer Faces	Apache MyFaces
316	Java Platform, Enterprise Edition (Java EE) 6		
317	Java Persistence API (JPA) 2.0	EclipseLink	Hibernate, openJPA
322	Java EE Connector Architecture (JCA) 1.6		
325	IMS Communication Enablers (ICE) (See IMS)		
330	Dependency Injection for Java	HK2	
336	Java SE 7 Release Contents	[OpenJDK 7]	?
337	Java SE 8 Release Contents	[OpenJDK 8]	?
338	Java Persistence API (JPA) 2.1	EclipseLink	Hibernate, openJPA
339	JAX-RS 2.0: The Java API for RESTful Web Services		
343	Java Message Service 2.0 (JMS)		
352	Java Batch	IBM Java Batch	JBeret, Spring Batch
354	Java Money & Currency API		
356	Java API for WebSocket		
365	Contexts and Dependency Injection for Java 2.0	Weld	
367	Java API for JSON Binding (JSON-B)	Eclipse Yasson	Jackson
370	Java API for RESTful Web Services (JAX-RS) 2.1	Project Jersey	
374	Java API for JSON Processing 1.1	Eclipse JSON-P	Jackson
376	Java Platform Module System (supersedes 277		
380	Bean Validation 2.0	Hibernate Validator	
901	The Java Language Specification, Third Edition (JLS) (as of J2SE 5.0 incorporates changes from JSRs 14, 41, 133, 175, 201, and 204)		
907	Java Transaction API (JTA) 1.0 and 1.1		
912	Java 3D API 1.3		
913	Java Community Process (JCP) 2.0, 2.1 & 2.5.		
914	Java Message Service (JMS) API 1.0 and 1.1		
924	Java Virtual Machine Specification, Second Edition (JVM) (as of J2SE 5.0).	OpenJDK	
926	Java 3D API 1.5		

== Criticism ==
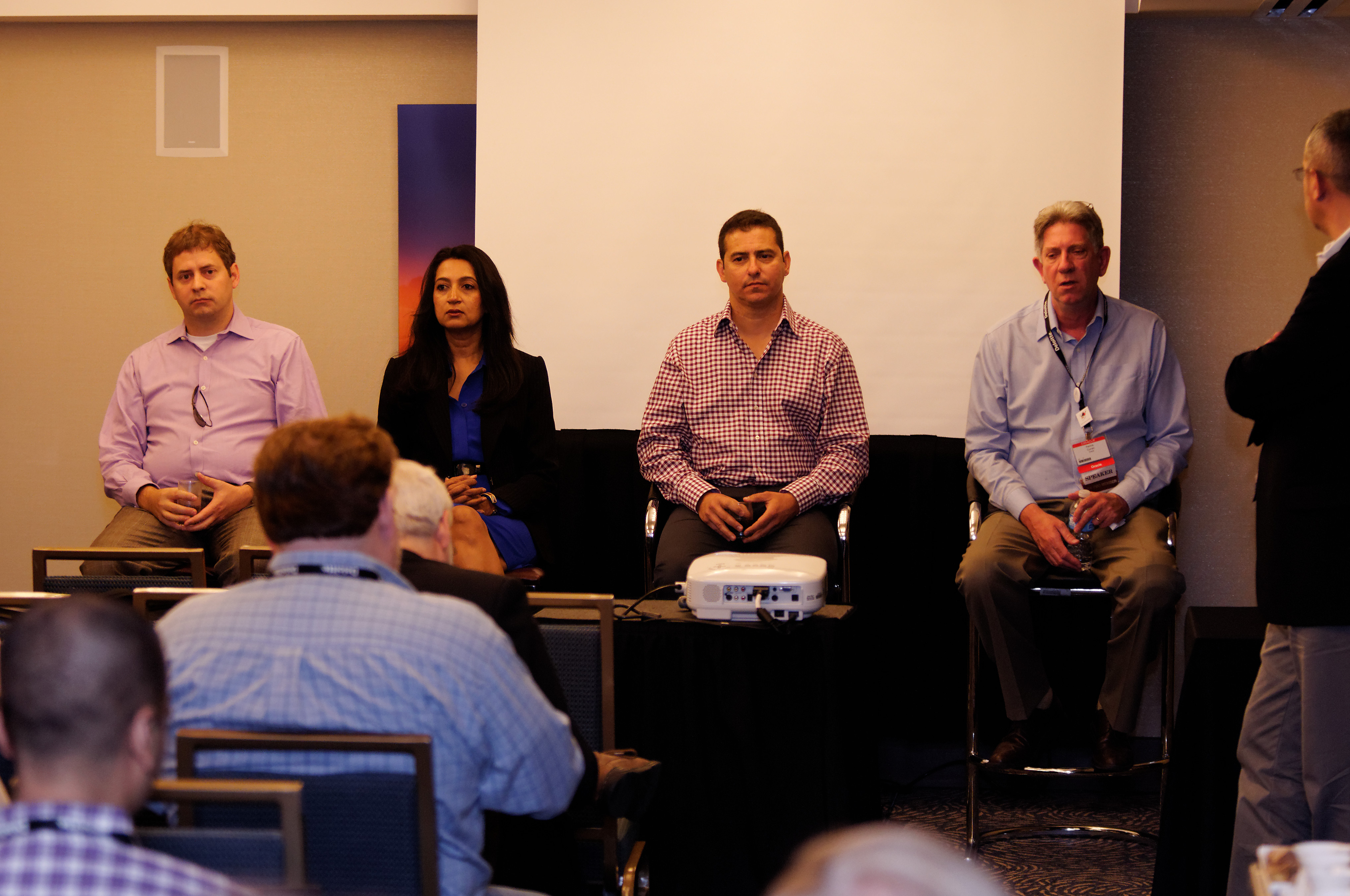
A JCP representative (far right) speaks to the trade press during a panel discussion at the JavaOne conference in 2012

The JCP's executive board has been characterized as a "rubber stamp organization" since Oracle acquired Sun Microsystems (the original developer of the Java language).

The Apache Software Foundation resigned its seat on the board in December 2010 because Oracle was unwilling to license the Technology Compatibility Kit for Apache's version of Java.

== JCP Program and Industry Awards ==
2012 — 10th Annual JCP Award Winners
Award	Nominee	Contributions	Details	JSR #	Win?
JCP Member/Participant of the Year	London Java Community and SouJava	"Adopt a JSR!" program	Supporting Java developers through the JCP.		Win!
JCP Member/Participant of the Year	Stephen Colebourne	Date and time API for Java.	Comprehensive and advanced. Tireless work.	310	
JCP Member/Participant of the Year	Markus Eisele	Active work among the German Java community and in the JSR 342 Expert Group.		342	
JCP Member/Participant of the Year	JUG Chennai	Becoming the most active JCP organization in India and a competitive service organization in the commercial marketplace.			
JCP Member/Participant of the Year	Werner Keil	Incredible energy and participation in seven JSRs as well as the Executive Committee.			
JCP Member/Participant of the Year	Antoine Sabot-Durand	JSR Early Draft Release – accomplished quickly and efficiently; Agorava Project candidate for JBoss Enterprise Framework (the successor to the Seam family of Open Source projects and CDI use cases for Java EE7).			
Outstanding Spec Lead	Victor Grazi, Credit Suisse	Java Money & Currency API	Dedicated, focused expertise in solving issues representing money and currencies.	354	Win!
Outstanding Spec Lead	Michael Ernst	Annotations on Java Types	Level-headed approach; a great example of a well-run JSR.	308	
Outstanding Spec Lead	Nigel Deakin, Oracle	Java Message Service 2.0	Outstanding, thorough, and intelligent work keeping the JMS 2 EG open and moving forward at a great pace.	343	
Outstanding Spec Lead	Pete Muir, Red Hat	Contexts and Dependency Injection for Java EE 1.1	Voluntarily upgrading to 2.8 in late 2011 and maintaining what were already transparent methods in running his Expert Group.	346	
Most Significant JSR	Jitendra Kotamraju	API for JSON Processing	An important step in bringing Java into the world of the modern web.	353	
Most Significant JSR	Victor Grazi, Credit Suisse	Money and Currency API	New ways of handling monetary amounts and currency computations. Fixing critical Java Number Format and Representation bugs beyond monetary values.	354	
Most Significant JSR	Mitch Upton	Java State Management	The potential to improve how Application Servers and Distributed Services are going to look in the near future as well as simplifying deployment in PaaS and Cloud environments.	350	
Most Significant JSR	Nigel Deakin	Java Message Service 2	Modernize JMS at a rapid pace.	343	
Most Significant JSR	Patrick Curran	JCP.Next	Setting the direction and procedures for the next-generation JCP.	348 355 358	Win!

== See also ==
- JDK Enhancement Proposal
