= Java Platform, Micro Edition =

Software platform for mobile and embedded devices

- Player software: Java
- Programming language(s): Java
- Application(s): Embedded systems, mobile devices
- Status: Inactive
- License: Proprietary licence by Oracle
- Website: www.oracle.com/java/technologies/javameoverview.html

Java Platform, Micro Edition, often called simply Java ME or J2ME, is a computing platform for development and deployment of portable code for embedded and mobile devices (micro-controllers, sensors, gateways, mobile phones, personal digital assistants, TV set-top boxes, printers). A program created for the platform is called a MIDlet.

The platform uses the object-oriented Java programming language, and is part of the Java software-platform family. It was designed by Sun Microsystems (now Oracle Corporation) in 1999 under the name Java 2 Platform, Micro Edition. The earliest commercial Java ME software and supporting consumer hardware were released in 2001. MIDlets run inside a Java virtual machine understood by devices of various mobile manufacturers. This "write once, run anywhere" approach along with highly compressed file sizes made Java ME very popular for building simple mobile apps, most notably mobile games.

As of 2013, there were more than three billion Java ME–enabled mobile phones in the market, but the platform was in continued decline by that time as feature phones had been overtaken by smartphones. Smartphones used dedicated hardware acceleration chips utilising APIs like OpenGL ES rather than relying on device CPU-based software rendering to handle graphics, which had mostly been the case on Java ME.

== History ==
Java 2 Platform Micro Edition (and the related K virtual machine) was announced on June 15, 1999. It would replace a similar technology, PersonalJava.

The platform used to be popular in feature phones, such as Nokia's Series 40 models. Siemens SL45i in 2001 was the first that could run Java. It was also supported on the Bada operating system and on Symbian OS along with native software. Users of Windows CE, Windows Mobile, Maemo, MeeGo and Android could download Java ME for their respective environments ("proof-of-concept" for Android).

Originally developed under the Java Community Process as JSR 68, the different flavors of Java ME have evolved in separate JSRs. Java ME devices implement a profile. The most common of these are the Mobile Information Device Profile aimed at mobile devices such as cell phones, and the Personal Profile aimed at consumer products and embedded devices like set-top boxes and PDAs. Profiles are subsets of configurations, of which there are currently two: the Connected Limited Device Configuration (CLDC) and the Connected Device Configuration (CDC).

In 2008, Java ME platforms were restricted to JRE 1.3 features and use that version of the class file format (internally known as version 47.0).

== Implementations ==
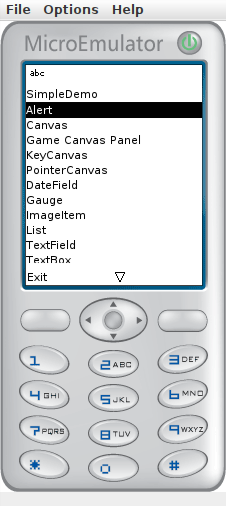
MicroEmulator screenshot

Oracle provides a reference implementation of the specification, and some configurations and profiles for MIDP and CDC. Starting with the JavaME 3.0 SDK, a NetBeans-based IDE supported them in a single IDE.

In contrast to the numerous binary implementations of the Java Platform built by Sun for servers and workstations, Sun tended not to provide binaries for the platforms of Java ME targets, and instead relied on third parties to provide their own.

The exception was an MIDP 1.0 JRE (JVM) for Palm OS. Sun provides no J2ME JRE for the Microsoft Windows Mobile (Pocket PC) based devices, despite an open-letter campaign to Sun to release a rumored internal implementation of PersonalJava known by the code name "Captain America". Third party implementations are widely used by Windows Mobile vendors.

At some point, Sun released a now-abandoned reference implementation under the name phoneME.

Operating systems targeting Java ME have been implemented by DoCoMo in the form of DoJa, and by SavaJe as SavaJe OS. The latter company was purchased by Sun in April 2007 and now forms the basis of Sun's JavaFX Mobile.

The open-source Mika VM aims to implement JavaME CDC/FP, but is not certified as such (certified implementations are required to charge royalties, which is impractical for an open-source project). Consequently, devices which use this implementation are not allowed to claim JavaME CDC compatibility.

The Linux-based Android operating system uses a proprietary version of Java that is similar in intent, but very different in many ways from Java ME.

=== Emulators ===
- Sun Java Wireless Toolkit (WTK, for short) — is a proprietary Java ME emulator, originally provided by Sun Microsystems, and later by Oracle.
- MicroEmulator (MicroEMU, for short) — is an open-source Java ME emulator.
- J2ME Loader — an Open Source Android Java ME emulator.
- FreeJ2ME-plus — A fork of FreeJ2ME, a free, cross-platform J2ME emulator with support for Libretro and AWT frontends.

There are other emulators, including emulators provided as part of development kits by phone manufacturers, such as Nokia, Sony-Ericsson, Siemens Mobile, etc.

== CLDC (Connected Limited Device Configuration) ==
The Connected Limited Device Configuration (CLDC) contains a strict subset of the Java-class libraries, and is the minimum amount needed for a Java virtual machine to operate. CLDC is basically used for classifying myriad devices into a fixed configuration.

A configuration provides the most basic set of libraries and virtual-machine features that must be present in each implementation of a J2ME environment. When coupled with one or more profiles, the Connected Limited Device Configuration gives developers a solid Java platform for creating applications for consumer and embedded devices. The configuration is designed for devices with 160KB to 512KB total memory, which has a minimum of 160KB of ROM and 32KB of RAM available for the Java platform.

=== Mobile Information Device Profile ===
Designed for mobile phones, the Mobile Information Device Profile includes a GUI, and a data storage API, and MIDP 2.0 includes a basic 2D gaming API. Applications written for this profile are called MIDlets.

JSR 271: Mobile Information Device Profile 3 (Final release on Dec 9, 2009) specified the 3rd generation Mobile Information Device Profile (MIDP3), expanding upon the functionality in all areas as well as improving interoperability across devices. A key design goal of MIDP3 is backward compatibility with MIDP2 content.

==== Information Module Profile ====
The Information Module Profile (IMP) is a profile for embedded, "headless" devices such as vending machines, industrial embedded applications, security systems, and similar devices with either simple or no display and with some limited network connectivity.

Originally introduced by Siemens Mobile and Nokia as JSR-195, IMP 1.0 is a strict subset of MIDP 1.0 except that it does not include user interface APIs — in other words, it does not include support for the Java package javax.microedition.lcdui. JSR-228, also known as IMP-NG, is IMP's next generation that is based on MIDP 2.0, leveraging MIDP 2.0's new security and networking types and APIs, and other APIs such as javax.microedition.PushRegistry and platformRequest(), but again it does not include UI APIs, nor the game API.

== Connected Device Configuration ==
The Connected Device Configuration is a subset of Java SE, containing almost all the libraries that are not GUI related. It is richer than CLDC.

=== Foundation Profile ===
The Foundation Profile is a Java ME Connected Device Configuration (CDC) profile. This profile is intended to be used by devices requiring a complete implementation of the Java virtual machine up to and including the entire Java Platform, Standard Edition API. Typical implementations will use some subset of that API set depending on the additional profiles supported. This specification was developed under the Java Community Process.

=== Personal Basis Profile ===
The Personal Basis Profile extends the Foundation Profile to include lightweight GUI support in the form of an AWT subset. This is the platform that BD-J is built upon.

== JSRs (Java Specification Requests) ==
=== Foundation ===
JSR #	Name	Description
68	J2ME Platform Specification	
30	CLDC 1.x	
37	MIDP 1.0	
118	MIDP 2.x	
139	CLDC 1.1	
271	MIDP 3.0	Java ME 3.4 and earlier only, Last Specification for Mobile Phones, Java Language features as Java SE 1.3
360	CLDC 8	New in Java ME 8
361	MEEP 8	New in Java ME 8, Language feature as Java SE 8, for Internet of Everything devices

=== Main extensions ===
JSR #	Name	Description	MSA
75	File Connection and PIM API	File system, contacts, calendar, to-do	Yes
82	Bluetooth	Bluetooth serial port communications and file exchanges (OBEX)	Yes
120	Wireless Messaging API (WMA)		
135	Mobile Media API (MMAPI)	Audio, video, multimedia	Yes
172	Web Services API	XML parsers and RPC	Yes
177	Security and Trust Services API (SATSA)	APDU, Java Card RMI (JCRMI), Public Key Infrastructure (PKI) and cryptography	Yes
179	Location API	GPS coordinates, street addresses, orientation sensors, landmark stores	Yes
180	SIP API		Yes
184	Mobile 3D Graphics (M3G)	High level 3D graphics	Yes
185	Java Technology for the Wireless Industry (JTWI)	General	
205	Wireless Messaging API (WMA) 2.0	Sending and receiving SMS and MMS	
211	Content Handler API (CHAPI)		Yes
226	Scalable 2D Vector Graphics API for J2ME (M2G)	Handling SVG Tiny	Yes
228	Information Module Profile – Next Generation (IMP NG)		
229	Payment API		Yes
234	Advanced Multimedia Supplements (AMMS)	MMAPI extensions	Yes
238	Mobile Internationalization API	Localized resources, locale date and number formatting, locale comparison of strings	Yes
239	Java Bindings for the OpenGL ES API		
248	Mobile Service Architecture (MSA)		Yes
253	Mobile Telephony API		
256	Mobile Sensor API	Reading values from accelerometers, gyroscopes, compasses, thermometers, barometers, and some more	
257	Contactless Communication API		
258	Mobile User Interface Customization API		
272	Mobile Broadcast Service API for Handheld Terminals		
280	XML API for Java ME		
281	IMS Services API		
287	Scalable 2D Vector Graphics API 2.0 for Java ME		
293	Location API 2.0		
298	Telematics API for Java ME		
300	DRM API for Java ME		
325	IMS Communication Enablers		

=== Future ===
JSR #	Name	Description
297	Mobile 3D Graphics API (M3G) 2.0	Proposed Final Draft for 14 Apr, 2009

== ESR ==
The ESR consortium is devoted to Standards for embedded Java. Especially cost effective Standards. Typical applications domains are industrial control, machine-to-machine, medical, e-metering, home automation, consumer, human-to-machine-interface, ...

ESR #	Name	Description
001	B-ON (Beyond CLDC)	B-ON serves as a very robust foundation for implementing embedded Java software. It specifies a reliable initialization phase of the Java device, and 3 kind of objects: immutable, immortal and regular (mortal) objects.
002	MicroUI	MicroUI defines an enhanced architecture to enable an open, third-party, application development environment for embedded HMI devices. Such devices typically have some form of display, some input sensors and potentially some sound rendering capabilities. This specification spans a potentially wide set of devices.
011	MWT	MWT defines three distinct roles: Widget Designers, Look and Feel Designers, and Application Designers. MWT allows a binary HMI application to run the same on all devices that provide a compliant MWT framework (embedded devices, cellphones, set-top box TV's, PC's, etc...) allowing for true consistency and ubiquity of applications across product lines (ME, SE, EE).
015	ECLASSPATH	ECLASSPATH unifies CLDC, CDC, Foundation, SE, and EE execution environments with a set of around 300 classes API. Compiling against CLDC1.1/ECLASSPATH makes binary code portable across all Java execution environments.

== See also ==
- Android (operating system)
- iOS
- BlackBerry OS
- Danger Hiptop
- Embedded Java
- JavaFX Mobile
- Mobile development
- Mobile games
- Mobile learning
- Qualcomm Brew
- Smartphone

== Bibliography ==
- Ben Hayun, Roy (March 30, 2009). Java ME on Symbian OS: Inside the Smartphone Model (1st ed.). Wiley. p. 482. ISBN 978-0-470-74318-8.
- Knudsen, Jonathan (January 8, 2008). Kicking Butt with MIDP and MSA: Creating Great Mobile Applications (1st ed.). Prentice Hall. p. 432. ISBN 978-0-321-46342-5.
- Li, Sing; Knudsen, Jonathan (April 25, 2005). Beginning J2ME: From Novice to Professional (3rd ed.). Apress. p. 480. ISBN 1-59059-479-7.
