= Connected Limited Device Configuration =

The Connected Limited Device Configuration (CLDC) is a specification of a framework for Java ME applications describing the basic set of libraries and virtual-machine features that must be present in an implementation. The CLDC is combined with one or more profiles to give developers a platform for building applications on embedded devices with very limited resources such as pagers and mobile phones. The CLDC was developed under the Java Community Process as JSR 30 (CLDC 1.0) and JSR 139 (CLDC 1.1).

== Typical requirements ==
CLDC is designed for devices that have limited processing power, memory, and graphical capability. Devices typically have the following features:

- 16-bit or 32-bit CPU with a clock speed of 16 MHz or higher
- At least 160 KB ROM allocated for the CLDC libraries and virtual machine
- At least 8 KB total RAM available to the Java platform
- Low power consumption, often operating on battery power
- Connectivity to some kind of network, often with a wireless, intermittent connection and limited bandwidth

== Noteworthy limitations ==
Compared to the Java SE environment, several APIs are absent entirely, and some APIs are altered such that code requires explicit changes to support CLDC. In particular, certain changes are not just the absence of classes or interfaces, but actually change the signatures of existing classes in the base class library. An example of this is the absence of the Serializable interface, which does not appear in the base class library due to restrictions on reflection usage. All java.lang.* classes which normally implement Serializable do not, therefore, implement this tagging interface.

Other examples of limitations depend on the version being used, as some features were re-introduced with version 1.1 of CLDC.

=== CLDC 1.0 and 1.1 ===
- The Serializable interface is not supported.
- Parts of the reflection capabilities of the Java standard edition:
  - The java.lang.reflect package and any of its classes not supported.
  - Methods on java.lang.Class which obtain Constructors or Methods or Fields.
- No finalization. CLDC does not include the Object.finalize() method.
- Limited error handling. Non-runtime errors are handled by terminating the application or resetting the device.
- No user-defined class loaders
- No thread groups or daemon threads.

== Profiles ==
A profile is a set of APIs that support devices with different capabilities and resources within the CLDC framework to provide a complete Java application environment. There are specific profiles for devices ranging from vending machines to set-top boxes, with the mobile phone profile MIDP being the most prevalent.

=== Mobile Information Device Profile ===
The Mobile Information Device Profile is a profile designed for cell phones. There are two versions of MIDP available, specified in JSR 37 (MIDP 1.0) and JSR 118 (MIDP 2.0). Both versions provide an LCD oriented GUI API, with MIDP 2.0 including a basic 2D gaming API. Applications written to use this profile are called MIDlets. Many cell phones come with a MIDP implementation, and it is a popular platform for downloadable cell phone games.

=== Information Module Profile ===
The Information Module Profile is specified in JSR 195 and is designed for vending machines, network cards, routers, telephone boxes and other systems with either simple or no display and some form of limited two way network access. Only APIs for application creation, storage, and network access are defined. These are a subset of the javax.microedition.io, rms and midlet packages in MIDP. Siemens Mobile and Nokia put forward this specification to the JCP.

=== DoJa Profile ===
The DoJa profile was designed for the i-mode mobile phone by NTT DoCoMo.

=== Digital Set Top Box Profile ===
The Digital Set Top Box profile, specified in JSR 242, is designed for the cable market. Also referred to as OnRamp, this profile is based on a subset of the OpenCable Application Platform (OCAP), which defines a set of APIs for the development of applications for set-top boxes and similar devices. The profile consists of subsets from the CDC Personal Basis Profile including support for AWT, Xlet, file access, and network APIs, as well as several media-related interfaces from OCAP. The whole profile encompassed 31 Java packages and approximately 1500 APIs.

== Optional Packages ==
The PDA Optional Packages are specified in JSR-75 and are designed for PDAs such as Palm or Windows CE devices. The specification defines two independent packages that represent important features found on many PDAs and other mobile devices. These packages are:

- Personal Information Management (PIM) which gives devices access to personal information management data contained in address books, calendars, and to-do lists.
- FileConnection (FC) which allows access to file systems and removable storage devices, such as external memory cards.

== General APIs ==
java.io
A streamlined version of the java.io package found in the standard edition for doing Input/Output operations.
java.lang
Contains classes that are essential to the Java language. This package contains standard java types like Integers and Strings as well as basic exceptions, math functions, system functions, threading and security functions.
java.util
A streamlined version of the java.util collection library. This package contains the collection classes like Vector and Hashtable. It also contains calendar and date class.

== See also ==
- Connected Device Configuration or CDC, another framework for building Java ME applications
