= OSGi Specification Implementations =

The OSGi framework is a standardized module system and service platform for the Java programming language. The OSGi standards are defined in the OSGi Specification Project at Eclipse and published in OSGi specification documents such as the Core and Compendium specifications. These specifications contain chapters each of which describe a specific OSGi standard. This article contains a list of available implementations of OSGi standards, both commercial and open source implementations are included.

Feel free to add mentions to additional implementations.

Implementations realize specification chapter(s) from the OSGi specification documents.

== Core Specification ==
- Latest Specification Release: R8
- Specification chapters: 2-10, 50-60, 101, 701

Specifications implemented by OSGi core frameworks. A compliant OSGi Framework must at least implement chapters 3-10 and 53-58.

== Compendium Specification ==
- Latest Specification Release: R8
- Specification chapters: 100-117, 119-123, 125-128, 130, 132-138, 140, 147, 148, 150-155, 157-159, 702, 705-707

== Enterprise Specification ==
- Latest Specification Release: R7
- Specification chapters: 100-102, 104-105, 107, 110, 112-113, 122-130, 132-135, 137, 138, 140, 147, 148, 150, 151, 152, 702, 705, 706, 707.

The Enterprise Specification contains an enterprise-focused subset of the OSGi specifications. Certain Specification chapters are not yet in the Compendium Specification document because it was released before the Enterprise Specification.

== Residential Specification ==
- Latest Specification Release: R6
- Specification chapters: Res2, Res3, 101-105, 107, 110-113, 117, 131, 135, 139, 141-146, 702, 705

The first release of the OSGi Residential Specification resolved the requirements of inter-operation with existing management systems and protocols, the need to remotely manage user applications life cycle as well as the need for large-scale deployments and adequate security. With this second release of the OSGi Residential Specification we introduce new specifications for abstracting devices, sensors, actuators, etc. from their corresponding communication protocols and facilitate the development of new innovative application and services. This release also contains specifications that address device connectivity via the EnOcean wireless protocol, USB and serial port. With the Resource Monitoring Specification, resources consumed by bundles can be monitored in order to fairly share resources and preserve the overall quality of service. The Network Interface Information Service Specification enables dynamic discovery of changes in the network interface.

== Mobile Specification ==
- Latest Specification Release: 4.0.1
- Specification chapters: 101, 104-105, 109, 112-120, 701-702

== Implementations ==
The following sections list implementations of OSGi specifications organized by chapter. The Version column indicates the OSGi specification version supported, not the project version. The Certification column indicates whether an implementation participates in the OSGi Certification Program. The exact version of certified implementations can be obtained from the relevant implementation projects. Note that the order in which projects appear in the tables below is alphabetically.

=== 2: Security ===
Latest Specification Version: 1.8

Implementation	Specification Version	Link	Certification
Apache Felix	1.7	http://felix.apache.org	Participates
Eclipse Equinox	1.8	http://eclipse.org/equinox	Participates
Knopflerfish	1.7	http://www.knopflerfish.org	Participates
ProSyst	1.5	http://www.prosyst.com	Participates

=== 3 - 60: Core Framework ===
Chapters 3-60 in the Core Release 8 specification.

The Core Release 8 specification comprises the following APIs, which every framework implementation must implement:

- Chapter 3: Module Layer, version 1.10
- Chapter 4: Life Cycle Layer, version 1.10
- Chapter 5: Service Layer, version 1.10
- Chapter 6: Resource API Specification, version 1.0
- Chapter 7: Bundle Wiring API Specification, version 1.2
- Chapter 8: Framework Namespaces Specification, version 1.2
- Chapter 9: Start Level API Specification, version 1.0
- Chapter 10: Framework API Specification, which contains the following packages
  - org.osgi.framework version 1.10
  - org.osgi.framework.launch version 1.2
  - org.osgi.resource version 1.0
  - org.osgi.framework.wiring version 1.2
  - org.osgi.framework.startlevel version 1.0
  - org.osgi.framework.namespace version 1.2
  - org.osgi.annotation.versioning version 1.1
  - org.osgi.annotation.bundle version 1.1
- Chapter 53: Resolver Hook Service Specification, version 1.0
- Chapter 54: Bundle Hook Service Specification, version 1.1
- Chapter 55: Service Hook Service Specification, version 1.1
- Chapter 56: Weaving Hook Service Specification, version 1.1
- Chapter 57: Data Transfer Objects Specification, version 1.1
- Chapter 58: Resolver Service Specification version 1.1 (was chapter 136 in Enterprise/Compendium R6 specs)
- Chapter 59: Condition Service Specification, version 1.0
- Chapter 60: Connect Specification, version 1.0

Implementation	Core Framework Release	Link	Certification
Apache Felix	8	http://felix.apache.org	Participates
Concierge	5	https://www.eclipse.org/concierge	
Eclipse Equinox	8	http://eclipse.org/equinox	Participates
JBoss	4.2	https://web.archive.org/web/20110308161235/http://www.jboss.org/jbossas/osgi	
Hitachi	4.x	http://www.hitachi-solutions.com/superj/sp/sjf/	
Knopflerfish	6	http://www.knopflerfish.org	Participates
ProSyst	4.2	http://www.prosyst.com	Participates

=== 7: Package Admin Service (OSGi Core Release 4.2 spec) ===
Latest Specification Version: 1.2

The Package Admin Service has been replaced by the Bundle Wiring API.

Implementation	Specification Version	Link	Certification
Apache Felix	1.2	http://felix.apache.org	Participates
Eclipse Equinox	1.2	http://eclipse.org/equinox	Participates
JBoss	1.2	https://web.archive.org/web/20110308161235/http://www.jboss.org/jbossas/osgi	
Knopflerfish	1.2	http://www.knopflerfish.org	Participates
ProSyst	1.2	http://www.prosyst.com	Participates

=== 8: Start Level Service (OSGi Core Release 4.2 spec) ===
Latest Specification Version: 1.1

The Start Level Service has been replaced by the Start Level API.

Implementation	Specification Version	Link	Certification
Apache Felix	1.1	http://felix.apache.org	Participates
Eclipse Equinox	1.1	http://eclipse.org/equinox	Participates
JBoss	1.1	https://web.archive.org/web/20110308161235/http://www.jboss.org/jbossas/osgi	
Knopflerfish	1.1	http://www.knopflerfish.org	Participates
ProSyst	1.1	http://www.prosyst.com	Participates

=== 50: Conditional Permission Admin Service ===
Chapter 9 in the Core 4.2 specification.

Latest Specification Version: 1.1

Implementation	Specification Version	Link	Certification
Apache Felix	1.1	http://felix.apache.org	Participates
Eclipse Equinox	1.1	http://eclipse.org/equinox	Participates
Knopflerfish	1.1	http://www.knopflerfish.org	Participates
ProSyst	1.1	http://www.prosyst.com	Participates

=== 51: Permission Admin Service ===
Chapter 10 in the Core 4.2 specification.

Latest Specification Version: 1.2

Implementation	Specification Version	Link	Certification
Apache Felix	1.2	http://felix.apache.org	Participates
Eclipse Equinox	1.2	http://eclipse.org/equinox	Participates
Knopflerfish	1.2	http://www.knopflerfish.org	Participates
ProSyst	1.2	http://www.prosyst.com	Participates

=== 52: URL Handler Service ===
Chapter 11 in the Core 4.2 specification.

Latest Specification Version: 1.0

Implementation	Specification Version	Link	Certification
Apache Felix	1.0	http://felix.apache.org	Participates
Eclipse Equinox	1.0	http://eclipse.org/equinox	Participates
JBoss	1.0	https://web.archive.org/web/20110308161235/http://www.jboss.org/jbossas/osgi	
Knopflerfish	1.0	http://www.knopflerfish.org	Participates
ProSyst	1.0	http://www.prosyst.com	Participates

=== 53-60 ===
Chapters 53 to 60 are part of the mandatory set of specifications implemented by every OSGi Core Framework.

=== 100: Remote Services ===
Chapter 13 in the Compendium 4.2 and Enterprise 4.2 specifications. Chapter 6 in the Core 4.3 specification.

Latest Specification Version: 1.1

Implementation	Specification Version	Link	Certification
Apache Aries	1.1	http://aries.apache.org/modules/rsa.html	
Apache CXF	1.0	http://cxf.apache.org/distributed-osgi.html	
Apache Karaf Cellar	1.0	http://karaf.apache.org	
Amdatu Remote Services	1.1	http://bitbucket.org/amdatu/amdatu-remoteservices	
Eclipse Communication Framework (ECF)	1.1	http://eclipse.org/ecf	
Paremus Service Fabric	1.0	https://paremus.com/products/	
SVC Delivery	1.0	https://code.google.com/p/osgi-remote-services	
AIOLOS Remote Services	1.0	http://aiolos.intec.ugent.be/	
Fabric8	1.0	http://fabric8.io/	

=== 101: Log Service ===
Latest Specification Version: 1.4

Implementation	Specification Version	Link	Certification
Apache Felix	1.3	http://felix.apache.org	Participates
Eclipse Equinox	1.3	http://eclipse.org/equinox	Participates
Knopflerfish	1.3	http://www.knopflerfish.org	Participates
ProSyst	1.3	http://www.prosyst.com	Participates
Pax Logging	1.3	http://ops4j1.jira.com/wiki/display/paxlogging/Pax+Logging	

=== 102: HTTP Service ===
Latest Specification Version: 1.2

Implementation	Specification Version	Link	Certification
Apache Felix	1.2	http://felix.apache.org	Participates
Eclipse Equinox	1.2	http://eclipse.org/equinox	Participates
Knopflerfish	1.2	http://www.knopflerfish.org	Participates
Pax Web	1.2	http://ops4j1.jira.com/wiki/display/paxweb/Pax+Web	
ProSyst	1.2	http://www.prosyst.com	Participates
GlassFish	1.2	https://wikis.oracle.com/display/GlassFish/OSGi	
JBoss	1.2	https://web.archive.org/web/20110308161235/http://www.jboss.org/jbossas/osgi	

=== 103: Device Access Service ===
Latest Specification Version: 1.1

Implementation	Specification Version	Link	Certification
Eclipse Equinox	1.1	http://eclipse.org/equinox	Participates
Knopflerfish	1.1	http://www.knopflerfish.org	Participates
ProSyst	1.1	http://www.prosyst.com	Participates

=== 104: Configuration Admin Service ===
Latest Specification Version: 1.6

Implementation	Specification Version	Link	Certification
Apache Felix	1.6	http://felix.apache.org	Participates
Eclipse Equinox	1.3	http://eclipse.org/equinox	Participates
JBoss	1.3	https://web.archive.org/web/20110308161235/http://www.jboss.org/jbossas/osgi	
Knopflerfish	1.5	http://www.knopflerfish.org	Participates
ProSyst	1.3	http://www.prosyst.com	Participates

=== 105: Metatype Service ===
Latest Specification Version: 1.4

Implementation	Specification Version	Link	Certification
Apache Felix	1.3	http://felix.apache.org	Participates
Eclipse Equinox	1.2	http://eclipse.org/equinox	Participates
Knopflerfish	1.2	http://www.knopflerfish.org	Participates
ProSyst	1.1	http://www.prosyst.com	Participates

=== 106: Preference Service ===
Latest Specification Version: 1.1

Implementation	Specification Version	Link	Certification
Apache Felix	1.1	http://felix.apache.org	Participates
Eclipse Equinox	1.1	http://eclipse.org/equinox	Participates
Knopflerfish	1.1	http://www.knopflerfish.org	Participates
ProSyst	1.1	http://www.prosyst.com	Participates

=== 107: User Admin Service ===
Latest Specification Version: 1.1

Implementation	Specification Version	Link	Certification
Eclipse Equinox	1.1	http://eclipse.org/equinox	Participates
Knopflerfish	1.1	http://www.knopflerfish.org	Participates
ProSyst	1.1	http://www.prosyst.com	Participates

=== 108: Wire Admin Service ===
Latest Specification Version: 1.0

Implementation	Specification Version	Link	Certification
Eclipse Equinox	1.0	http://eclipse.org/equinox	Participates
Knopflerfish Pro	1.0	http://www.makewave.com	Participates
ProSyst	1.0	http://www.prosyst.com	Participates

=== 109: IO Connector Service ===
Latest Specification Version: 1.3

Implementation	Specification Version	Link	Certification
Eclipse Equinox	1.3	http://eclipse.org/equinox	Participates
Knopflerfish	1.3	http://www.knopflerfish.org	Participates
ProSyst	1.3	http://www.prosyst.com	Participates

=== 110: Initial Provisioning Service ===
Latest Specification Version: 1.2

Implementation	Specification Version	Link	Certification
Eclipse Equinox	1.2	http://eclipse.org/equinox	Participates
Knopflerfish Pro	1.2	http://www.makewave.com	Participates
ProSyst	1.2	http://www.prosyst.com	Participates

=== 111: Device Service Specification for UPnP™ ===
Latest Specification Version: 1.2

Implementation	Specification Version	Link	Certification
Apache Felix	1.1	http://felix.apache.org	Participates
Knopflerfish Pro	1.2	http://www.makewave.com	Participates
ProSyst	1.1	http://www.prosyst.com	Participates

=== 112: Declarative Services ===
Latest Specification Version: 1.4

Implementation	Specification Version	Link	Certification
Apache Felix (SCR)	1.4	http://felix.apache.org	Participates
Eclipse Equinox	1.2	http://eclipse.org/equinox	Participates
Knopflerfish	1.2	http://www.knopflerfish.org	Participates
ProSyst	1.1	http://www.prosyst.com	Participates
Bnd	1.3 (annotations)	https://github.com/bndtools/bnd	

=== 113: Event Admin Service ===
Latest Specification Version: 1.4

Implementation	Specification Version	Link	Certification
Apache Felix	1.3	http://felix.apache.org	Participates
Eclipse Equinox	1.3	http://eclipse.org/equinox	Participates
Knopflerfish	1.3	http://www.knopflerfish.org	Participates
ProSyst	1.2	http://www.prosyst.com	Participates

=== 114: Deployment Admin Service ===
Latest Specification Version: 1.1

Implementation	Specification Version	Link	Certification
Apache Felix	1.1	http://felix.apache.org	Participates
Knopflerfish Pro	1.1	http://www.makewave.com	Participates
ProSyst	1.1	http://www.prosyst.com	Participates

=== 115: Auto Configuration Service ===
Latest Specification Version: 1.0

Implementation	Specification Version	Link	Certification
Knopflerfish Pro	1.0	http://www.makewave.com	Participates
ProSyst	1.0	http://www.prosyst.com	Participates

=== 116: Application Admin Service ===
Latest Specification Version: 1.1

Implementation	Specification Version	Link	Certification
Eclipse Equinox	1.1	http://eclipse.org/equinox	Participates
Knopflerfish Pro	1.1	http://www.makewave.com	Participates
ProSyst	1.1	http://www.prosyst.com	Participates

=== 117: DMT Admin Service ===
Latest Specification Version: 2.0

Implementation	Specification Version	Link	Certification
Knopflerfish Pro	2.0	http://www.makewave.com	Participates
ProSyst	1.0	http://www.prosyst.com	Participates

=== 119: Monitor Admin Service ===
Latest Specification Version: 1.0

Implementation	Specification Version	Link	Certification
Knopflerfish Pro	1.0	http://www.makewave.com	Participates
KnowHowLab.org	1.0	https://github.com/knowhowlab/org.knowhowlab.osgi.monitoradmin	
ProSyst	1.0	http://www.prosyst.com	Participates

=== 120: Foreign Applications Access ===
Latest Specification Version: 1.0

Implementation	Specification Version	Link	Certification
Knopflerfish Pro	1.0	http://www.makewave.com	Participates
ProSyst	1.0	http://www.prosyst.com	Participates

=== 121: Blueprint Container ===
Latest Specification Version: 1.0

Implementation	Specification Version	Link	Certification
Apache Aries	1.0	http://aries.apache.org/	
Eclipse Gemini	1.0	http://eclipse.org/gemini	Participates

=== 122: Remote Service Admin ===
Latest Specification Version: 1.1

Implementation	Specification Version	Link	Certification
Apache CXF	1.0	http://cxf.apache.org/distributed-osgi.html	
Amdatu Remote	1.1	http://www.amdatu.org/components/remote.html	
Eclipse ECF	1.1	http://eclipse.org/ecf	
Paremus Service Fabric	1.1	https://paremus.com/products/	
AIOLOS RemoteServiceAdmin	1.0	http://aiolos.intec.ugent.be/	

=== 123: JTA Service ===
Latest Specification Version: 1.0

Implementation	Specification Version	Link	Certification
Apache Aries	1.0	http://aries.apache.org/	
JBoss	1.0	https://web.archive.org/web/20110308161235/http://www.jboss.org/jbossas/osgi	
GlassFish	1.0	https://wikis.oracle.com/display/GlassFish/OSGi	

=== 124: JMX Management Model ===
Latest Specification Version: 1.1

Implementation	Specification Version	Link	Certification
Apache Aries	1.1	http://aries.apache.org/	
Eclipse Gemini	1.0	http://eclipse.org/gemini	
KnowHowLab.org	1.0	https://code.google.com/p/osgilab/wiki/JMX	

=== 125: Data Service Specification for JDBC™ Technology ===
Latest Specification Version: 1.0

Implementation	Specification Version	Link	Certification
Eclipse Gemini	1.0	http://eclipse.org/gemini	
GlassFish	1.0	https://wikis.oracle.com/display/GlassFish/OSGi	
Pax JDBC	1.0	http://team.ops4j.org/wiki/display/PAXJDBC/Pax+JDBC	

=== 126: JNDI Service ===
Latest Specification Version: 1.0

Implementation	Specification Version	Link	Certification
Apache Aries	1.0	http://aries.apache.org/	
Eclipse Gemini	1.0	http://eclipse.org/gemini	

=== 127: JPA Service ===
Latest Specification Version: 1.1

Implementation	Specification Version	Link	Certification
Apache Aries	1.1	http://aries.apache.org/	
Eclipse Gemini	1.0	http://eclipse.org/gemini	

=== 128: Web Applications ===
Latest Specification Version: 1.0

Implementation	Specification Version	Link	Certification
Pax Web	1.0 (WAB support)	http://ops4j1.jira.com/wiki/display/paxweb/Pax+Web	
Pax URL	1.0 (URL handler)	http://ops4j1.jira.com/wiki/display/paxurl/Pax+URL	
Apache Aries	1.0 (URL handler)	http://aries.apache.org/	
Eclipse Gemini	1.0	http://eclipse.org/gemini	
GlassFish	1.0	https://wikis.oracle.com/display/GlassFish/OSGi	
JBoss	1.0	https://web.archive.org/web/20110308161235/http://www.jboss.org/jbossas/osgi	

=== 129: SCA Configuration Type ===
Latest Specification Version: 1.0

Implementation	Specification Version	Link	Certification

=== 130: Coordinator Service Specification ===
Latest Specification Version: 1.0

Implementation	Specification Version	Link	Certification
Apache Felix	1.0	http://felix.apache.org	Participates
Eclipse Equinox	1.0	http://eclipse.org/equinox	Participates

=== 131: TR069 Connector Service Specification ===
Latest Specification Version: 1.0

Implementation	Specification Version	Link	Certification

=== 132: Repository Service Specification ===
Latest Specification Version: 1.1

Implementation	Specification Version	Link	Certification
JBoss	1.1	https://web.archive.org/web/20110308161235/http://www.jboss.org/jbossas/osgi	
Knopflerfish	1.0	http://www.knopflerfish.org/maven2/index.xml%5B%5D	
AIOLOS Repository	1.0	http://aiolos.intec.ugent.be	
Package Drone	1.0 (XML index)	http://packagedrone.org	
Felix OBR	1.0	http://felix.apache.org	

=== 133: Service Loader Mediator Specification ===
Latest Specification Version: 1.0

Implementation	Specification Version	Link	Certification
Apache Aries (SPI-Fly)	1.0	http://aries.apache.org/	

=== 134: Subsystem Service Specification ===
Latest Specification Version: 1.1

Implementation	Specification Version	Link	Certification
Apache Aries	1.1	http://aries.apache.org/	

=== 137: REST Management Service Specification ===
Latest Specification Version: 1.0

Implementation	Specification Version	Link	Certification
Eclipse Concierge	1.0	https://github.com/eclipse/concierge/tree/master/bundles	Participates

=== 138: Asynchronous Service Specification ===
Latest Specification Version: 1.0

Implementation	Specification Version	Link	Certification
Apache Aries	1.0	http://aries.apache.org	

=== 139: EnOcean Device Service Specification ===
Latest Specification Version: 1.0

Implementation	Specification Version	Link	Certification
Eclipse SmartHome	1.0	https://github.com/eclipse/smarthome.osgi-ri.enocean	

=== 140: Http Whiteboard Specification ===
Latest Specification Version: 1.1

Implementation	Specification Version	Link	Certification
Apache Felix	1.0	http://felix.apache.org	
Eclipse Equinox	1.0	http://www.eclipse.org/equinox/	

=== 141: Device Abstraction Layer Specification ===
Latest Specification Version: 1.0

Implementation	Specification Version	Link	Certification

=== 142: Device Abstraction Layer Functions Specification ===
Latest Specification Version: 1.0

Implementation	Specification Version	Link	Certification

=== 143: Network Interface Information Service Specification ===
Latest Specification Version: 1.0

Implementation	Specification Version	Link	Certification
KnowHowLab.org	1.0	https://github.com/knowhowlab/org.knowhowlab.osgi.networkadapter	

=== 144: Resource Monitoring Specification ===
Latest Specification Version: 1.0

Implementation	Specification Version	Link	Certification

=== 145: USB Information Device Category Specification ===
Latest Specification Version: 1.0

Implementation	Specification Version	Link	Certification

=== 146: Serial Devices Service Specification ===
Latest Specification Version: 1.0

Implementation	Specification Version	Link	Certification

=== 147: Transaction Control Service Specification ===
Latest Specification Version: 1.0

Implementation	Specification Version	Link	Certification
Apache Aries	1.0	http://aries.apache.org	

=== 148: Cluster Information Specification ===
Latest Specification Version: 1.0

Implementation	Specification Version	Link	Certification
Eclipse Concierge	1.0	https://www.eclipse.org/concierge	

=== 149: Device Service Specification for ZigBee™ ===
Latest Specification Version: 1.0

Implementation	Specification Version	Link	Certification

=== 150: Configurator Specification ===
Latest Specification Version: 1.0

Implementation	Specification Version	Link	Certification
Apache Felix	1.0	http://felix.apache.org	

=== 151: JAX-RS Whiteboard Specification ===
Latest Specification Version: 1.0

Implementation	Specification Version	Link	Certification
Apache Aries	1.0	http://aries.apache.org	

=== 152: CDI Integration Specification ===
Latest Specification Version: 1.0

Implementation	Specification Version	Link	Certification
Apache Aries	1.0	http://aries.apache.org	

=== 153: Service Layer API for oneM2M™ ===
Latest Specification Version: 1.0

Implementation	Specification Version	Link	Certification

=== 154: Residential Device Management Tree Specification ===
Latest Specification Version: 1.0

Implementation	Specification Version	Link	Certification

=== 155: TR-157 Amendment 3 Software Module Guidelines ===
Latest Specification Version: 1.0

Implementation	Specification Version	Link	Certification

=== 157: Typed Event Service Specification ===
Latest Specification Version: 1.0

Implementation	Specification Version	Link	Certification

=== 158: Log Stream Provider Service Specification ===
Latest Specification Version: 1.0

Implementation	Specification Version	Link	Certification

=== 159: Feature Service Specification ===
Latest Specification Version: 1.0

Implementation	Specification Version	Link	Certification
Apache Felix	1.0	http://felix.apache.org	

=== 702: XML Parser Service Specification ===
Latest Specification Version: 1.0

Implementation	Specification Version	Link	Certification

=== 703: Position Specification ===
Latest Specification Version: 1.0

Implementation	Specification Version	Link	Certification

=== 704: Measurement and State Specification ===
Latest Specification Version: 1.0

Implementation	Specification Version	Link	Certification

=== 705: Promises Specification ===
Latest Specification Version: 1.1

Implementation	Specification Version	Link	Certification
Apache Aries	1.1	http://aries.apache.org	
OSGi	1.1	https://www.osgi.org	

=== 706: Push Stream Specification ===
Latest Specification Version: 1.0

Implementation	Specification Version	Link	Certification
Apache Aries	1.0	http://aries.apache.org	
OSGi	1.0	https://www.osgi.org	

=== 707: Converter Specification ===
Latest Specification Version: 1.0

Implementation	Specification Version	Link	Certification
OSGi	1.0	https://www.osgi.org	

== See also ==
- OSGi
