= Spatiotemporal Epidemiological Modeler =

Software program

STEM
- Developers: IBM, BfR, Eclipse Foundation
- Initial release: 2006
- Stable release: V4.0.0
- Repository: dev.eclipse.org/svnroot/technology/org.eclipse.stem/
- Written in: Java software
- Operating system: Any (Java software)
- Available in: English (with Java National Language Support)
- Type: Scientific software
- License: EPL
- Website: www.eclipse.org/stem/

The Spatiotemporal Epidemiological Modeler (STEM) is free software available through the Eclipse Foundation. Originally developed by IBM Research, STEM is a framework and development tool designed to help scientists create and use spatial and temporal models of infectious disease. STEM uses a component software architecture based on the OSGi standard. The Eclipse Equinox platform is a reference implementation of that standard. By using a component software architecture, all of the components or elements required for a disease model, including the code and the data are available as software building blocks that can be independently exchanged, extended, reused, or replaced. These building blocks or plug-ins are called eclipse "plug-ins" or "extensions". STEM plug-ins contain denominator data for administrative regions of interest. The regions are indexed by standard (ISO3166) codes.

STEM currently includes a large number of plug-ins for the 244 countries and dependent areas defined by the Geographic Coding Standard maintained by the International Organization for Standardization. These plug-ins contain global data including geographic data, population data, demographics, and basic models of disease. The disease models distributed with STEM include epidemiological compartment models. Other plug-ins describe relationships between regions including nearest-neighbor or adjacency relationships as well as information about transportation, such as connections by roads and a model of air transportation.

Relationships between regions can then be included in models of how a disease spreads from place to place. To accomplish this, STEM represents the world as a "graph". The nodes in the graph correspond to places or regions, and the edges in the graph describe relationships or connections between regions. Both the nodes and the edges can be labeled or "decorated" with a variety of denominator data and models. This graphical representation is implemented using the Eclipse Modeling Framework (EMF). Since a model can be built up using separate subgraphs, STEM enables model composition. Predefined subgraphs defining different countries can be assembled with a drag and drop interface. New disease vectors can simply be added to existing models by augmenting the model with a new set of edges. The architecture also supports collaboration as users can not only create new models and compose new scenarios but also exchange these models and scenarios as reusable components and thereby build on each other's work. As an open source project, users are encouraged to create their own plug-ins (both data and models) and, if appropriate, to contribute their work back to the project.
