= Steven Schuurman =

Dutch technology entrepreneur

- Born: Teunis Steven Schuurman; September 1975 (age 50–51); Delft, Netherlands
- Education: Reichman University
- Known for: Co-founder and former CEO, Elastic
- Board member of: Elastic

Teunis Steven Schuurman (born September 1975) is a Dutch technology and media entrepreneur, best known for co-founding and being the first CEO of Elastic, a data search and analytics company listed at the NYSE (ESTC). After stepping down as CEO of Elastic in 2017, he started to work towards dedicating his time and resources exclusively to philanthropy. He is also the co-founder of Atlantis Entertainment, SpringSource and the founder of the non-profit organisations the Dreamery Foundation and FutureNL.

== Career ==
Schuurman started his career in 2000 at Sogyo, a software consulting and project delivery company. Initially, he was stationed at Business Objects. In 2002 he shifted his focus towards the commercial growth of Sogyo.

In 2005, Schuurman left Sogyo and became the co-owner and Director of the Amsterdam based JTeam, an Amsterdam-based software application development company. Months after joining JTeam, Schuurman left and co-founded the open-source company SpringSource with Rod Johnson, Jürgen Höller, and Alef Arendsen. Originally branded Interface21, SpringSource delivered products and services around the open-source Enterprise Java framework, the Spring Framework. After having raised various mid-sized rounds of venture capital from venture capital firms Benchmark (Peter Fenton) and Accel (Kevin Efrusy). In August 2009 SpringSource was acquired by VMware (NYSE: VMW) for $420 million USD.

In December 2009, Schuurman left VMware to come back to JTeam as the CEO. During his 2 year tenure as CEO, Schuurman acquired several companies with JTeam, growing the company by 500%. JTeam rebranded to Orange11 and was acquired in 2012 by the Danish software company Trifork.

=== Elastic ===
Schuurman co-founded Elastic NV, formerly known by the name of its product Elasticsearch, with Shay Banon, Uri Boness and Simon Willnauer. Elastic is a search company that builds self-managed and SaaS offerings for search, logging, analytics, and security use cases. Under Schuurman's leadership, the company became one of Europe's fastest-growing technology scale-ups. In the first 2 years of his tenure as CEO, Schuurman raised various rounds of venture capital investment from Benchmark (Peter Fenton), Index Ventures (Mike Volpi), and New Enterprise Associates (Harry Weller, 1969-2016). In May 2017, Schuurman stepped down as CEO of Elastic, and co-founder Shay Banon took over.

In October 2018 Elastic went public on the New York Stock Exchange for an introduction price of $36 per share and an opening price of $70, indicating a 94% jump. Elastic is listed as ESTC. Schuurman is a non-executive board director.

=== Atlantis Entertainment ===
In January 2016, Schuurman co-founded the Hollywood Hills-based media & entertainment company Atlantis Entertainment together with Nuno Bettencourt and Rene Rigal. Atlantis Entertainment is a full-service media & production company, which creates and produces content through ventures integrating film & television, music, branded entertainment, commercials & digital content. Schuurman serves on the board of directors of Atlantis Entertainment.

== Wealth ==
According to Forbes, Schuurman has a wealth of US$1.5 billion. Schuurman has stated that he has limited interest in money and material items and plans to put his wealth to use for protecting future generations. He currently ranks #2035 on the 2021 Forbes list of wealthiest people.

== Philanthropy ==
In 2020, Schuurman founded The Dreamery Foundation, which aims to positively contribute to keeping our planet habitable for future generations. The foundation financially supports existing initiatives that contribute to achieving its mission. Schuurman has credited the extensive research of the effective altruism community as a major influence.

Since September 2018, Schuurman has been a board member at the Rijksmuseum Fund foundation. As of January 2020, Schuurman is on the board of Techleap.nl. Schuurman's initial philanthropic activities took place through the foundation he founded in 2014, FutureNL. This foundation aims to bring digital literacy to primary and secondary schools in the Netherlands. According to the foundation, it reaches over 60% of primary school children and 40% of secondary school children. Schuurman is on the board of FutureNL as chairman. In 2021 Schuurman joined The Giving Pledge, a campaign established by Bill Gates and Warren Buffett to persuade and recruit extremely wealthy people to contribute a majority of their wealth to philanthropic causes.

In 2023, Schuurman, along with social entrepreneur Laurens de Groot, founded the Centre for Future Generations, a think tank aimed at helping decision-makers anticipate and govern rapid technological change and ensuring that emerging technologies are used in the best interests of humanity.

== Politics ==
Leading up to the Dutch elections in March 2021, Schuurman made donations to political parties in The Netherlands. Via the Dreamery Foundation, he donated €1,000,000 to D66, and another €350,000 to the Party for the Animals. This was the first time in the history of Dutch politics that a private individual has made donations at this scale. Schuurman elaborated on his rationale to make these donations, and the reasons for making them openly, in the Dutch national newspaper Trouw.

Schuurman explicitly reported not to be a member of any political party, including D66 and Party for the Animals. The stated objective of his donations was to support those parties who have the most rigorous and actionable, comprehensive plans for climate action, and long-term thinking.

Before the German federal election in September 2021, Schuurman donated €1,250,000 to the German Greens.

In 2023 Schuurman, via the Dreamery Foundation, donated a total of €750,000 to Volt Europa.

== Awards ==
In 2014 Schuurman was listed on Goldman Sachs list of Most Intriguing Entrepreneurs. In 2015, Schuurman won the LOEY award, Holland's Entrepreneur of the Year award for technology entrepreneurs.

== Past activities ==
Schuurman served as chairman of the board of Dutch scaleup Geophy from 2018 until 2020, and as a board member of Dutch non-profit Smart Parks Foundation from 2018 until 2021.
