= Orange and Bronze Software Labs =

Software developer

Orange and Bronze
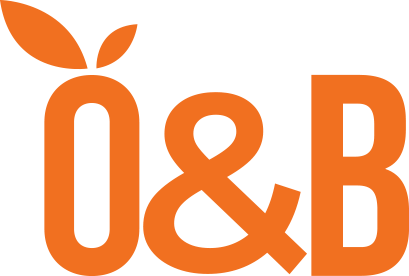
- Type: Private
- Industry: Computer hardware, Computer software, IT services, IT consulting, with a focus on Java development
- Founded: July 2005
- Founder: Calen Martin Legaspi; Renato "Butch" Landingin
- Headquarters: Makati, Philippines
- Area served: Worldwide
- Number of employees: 70+
- Website: https://orangeandbronze.com

Orange and Bronze (O&B) is a privately owned computer software development company based in the Philippines. The company delivers software consulting, product engineering, and IT training services with a focus on Java software development. O&B specializes in developing and deploying web applications using Java-based frameworks and technologies such as Spring (framework), Grails (framework), Hibernate (Java), Google Maps API, Google App Engine, and Android.

O&B develops software using the Agile software development methods. The company is the first Philippine-based SpringSource partner (now VMware vFabric) and listed as a Grails framework development company.

O&B is also an authorized reseller of the Pentaho Business Intelligence Suite.

== History ==
Orange and Bronze was founded in July 2005 by Calen Martin Legaspi and Renato "Butch" Landingin.

The company started as a two-man consulting firm doing software training for local software companies. Their clients eventually hired them as software consultants, before the company ventured into offshore software development projects. This led to partnerships with Google, SpringSource and Pentaho.

As of March 2011, Orange and Bronze's headcount is at 90 employees.

== Founders ==
Calen Martin Legaspi is the co-founder and CEO of Orange and Bronze. He co-founded PinoyJUG, or the Association of Philippine Java Developers. He is currently part of the Technology Council for the Philippine Software Industry Association (PSIA) as Director for Technology. He is also the official representative to the Commission on Higher Education (CHED) Technical Committee on Computer Science.

Renato "Butch" Landingin is Calen Legaspi's co-founder. He serves as the company's Chief Technology Officer. Butch Landingin is the author of Squishdot, which is described as "a web based news publishing and discussion product that allows you to handle threaded discussions with a minimum of configuration and day-to-day management by building a web-based news site."

== Services ==
O&B offers software consulting and offshore product development services with a focus on Enterprise Java and Agile software development.

O&B is also listed as a Google Enterprise Partner in the Philippines. The company's Google Apps implementations include nationwide change management training and deployment of 600,000 licenses for a government institution, and migration from a legacy system for the Department of Finance and for the largest Filipino software firm - Pointwest Technologies.

The company also offers software training classes in the Philippines, with courses that include Java Bootcamp, Spring and Hibernate Framework training, Groovy and Grails training, Apache Struts training, JavaServer Faces training, Enterprise Architecture, Agile with Scrum (development) and XP training, and Android training through its O&B University program.

== Incubation ==
Through the company’s technopreneurship program, O&B incubated the Google Maps-based real estate search site, Haybol.ph in 2010, founded by O&B employees Edge Dalmacio and Lorenzo Dee.

O&B also incubated Kandroid, an Android application developed by MilObjects Software, that is "a simple application used to visualize and control personal tasks." This application can be downloaded from Google Play.

In 2012, it incubated Open for Business Online (O4BO), a subscription service that follows the SaaS delivery model, that offers the Liferay, an open source enterprise portal; Openbravo, a web-based ERP; Apache Jackrabbit, a content repository; and SugarCRM, a CRM system. O4BO was conceptualized by Michael Oliver.

== Open source ==
Orange and Bronze is a proponent of open-source software technologies. The company encourages its employees to contribute to open source projects.

Renato “Butch” Landingin, co-founder and chief technology officer, is the author of an open source application called Squishdot, written in Python and Zope. Squishdot is a news and publishing content management system used by KDE Dot News. He also authored the Batch Jobs Management Console (Batman-Con), a web-based application written in Grails (framework) to monitor batch runs of Spring Batch-based batch jobs.

Michael Mallete, the vice president for consulting services, developed open source applications S2PFace, Grails SoundManager Plugin and Robot Framework Maven Plugin.

Lorenzo Dee, AVP for consulting services, developed the Java Computer Interface to Message Distribution API (JCIMD), a simple Java implementation of CIMD protocol.
