= OSAMI-F =

The research project OSAMI-F is the French subproject of the European ITEA 2 project OSAMI (Open Source AMbient Intelligence).

The aim of the international project OSAMI is the design of a basic, widely applicable SOA-oriented component platform, its development, test and its provision as open-source software. The project consists of a number of national sub-projects, each focusing on a certain field of application.

OSGi and Web Services forms the technical basis of the OSAMI platform in order to implement distributed, dynamically configurable, vendor-neutral and device-independent solutions.

The French sub-project OSAMI-F, funded by the Ministry of the Economy, Industry and Employment, contributes to different transversal areas such as engineering, architecture, tools and security and with demonstrators in the fields of sensor networking and efficient energy.

Project data
Supporting organisations: ITEA2, Ministry of the Economy, Industry and Employment
Duration: 01.01.2009 - 30.06.2011

== General information ==
The main objective of OSAMI is to connect technologically vertical markets on the basis of an open platform and, hence, to facilitate the market entry for small and medium-sized enterprises (SME).

=== Technical and Scientific Objectives of OSAMI-F ===
1. Establishment of common engineering principles
2. Establishment of common architecture for interoperability
3. Linking vertical domains through the common platform
4. Demonstrate the platform
5. Elaborate policy and acquisition recommendations

=== Participants ===
- Bull
- EDF
- Grenoble Institute of Technology
- Thalès Communications
- University of Grenoble I

=== Work Packages and Tasks ===
- WP 1: Coordination and Dissemination
- WP 2: Business, Trust and Processes
- WP 3: Organisation, Tools and Training
- WP 4: Vertical Domains
- WP 5: OSAMI Interface & Architecture
- WP 6: Security, Assets and User interface issues
- WP 7: Demonstrators
