= Project Grizzly =

Project Grizzly may refer to:

- Project Grizzly (film), 1996 film
- Project Grizzly (software)
