= Science of Science Tool (Sci2) =

The Science of Science (Sci2) Tool is a modular toolset specifically designed for the study of science. It supports the temporal, geospatial, topical, and network analysis and visualization of datasets at the micro (individual), meso (local), and macro (global) levels. Users of the tool can:

- Access science datasets online or load their own.
- Perform different types of analysis with the most effective algorithms available.
- Use different visualizations to interactively explore and understand specific datasets.
- Share datasets and algorithms across scientific boundaries.

== Overview ==
The Sci2 Tool is built on the Cyberinfrastructure Shell (CIShell), an open-source software framework for the easy integration and utilization of datasets, algorithms, tools, and computing resources developed by the Cyberinfrastructure for Network Science Center at Indiana University. CIShell is based on the OSGi R4 Specification and Equinox implementation. Sci2 usage is detailed in the Sci2 Manual and taught in the Information Visualization MOOC.

== Details ==
Sci2 hosts many tools to aid in every step of the data preparation, analysis, and visualization process. Listed are a few of the many Sci2 features:

=== Supported data sources ===
Data formats that are currently supported on the Sci2 platform:

- BibTeX (.bib)
- TreeML (.xml)
- CSV (*.csv)
- Edgelist (.edge)
- Endnote Export Format (.enw)
- GraphML (.xml or .graphml)
- ISI (*.isi)
- NSF csv format (.nsf)
- NSF format (.nsf)
- Pajek (*.net)
- Scopus format (*.scopus)
- XGMML (.xml)
- NWB (.nwb)
- Pajek Matrix (.mat)

=== Functionality ===
- Loading Data: load a supported file format for preparation, analysis, or visualization.
- Data Preparation: extract networks from raw data or update currently existing networks by merging nodes and removing duplicates.
- Processing: clean data for analysis and visualization.
- Analysis: employ a variety of advanced analysis algorithms for temporal, topical, geospatial, and network data.
- Modeling: graph generation with aging, scaling, random, and other specifications.
- Visualization: visualize temporal, topical, geospatial, and network data.

=== Development ===
The CNS Center and Sci2 developers encourage users to modify and develop plugins and functionality for the tool. The entire platform is open-source and the source code can be downloaded from the SVN repository.
