= GORM =

Gorm or GORM may refer to:

- Gorm (computing), Graphical Object Relationship Modeller, a graphical interface builder application in the developer tools of GNUstep
- Grails Object Relational Mapping (GORM), the persistence layer of the Grails framework
