= Apache Felix =

Open-source OSGi framework

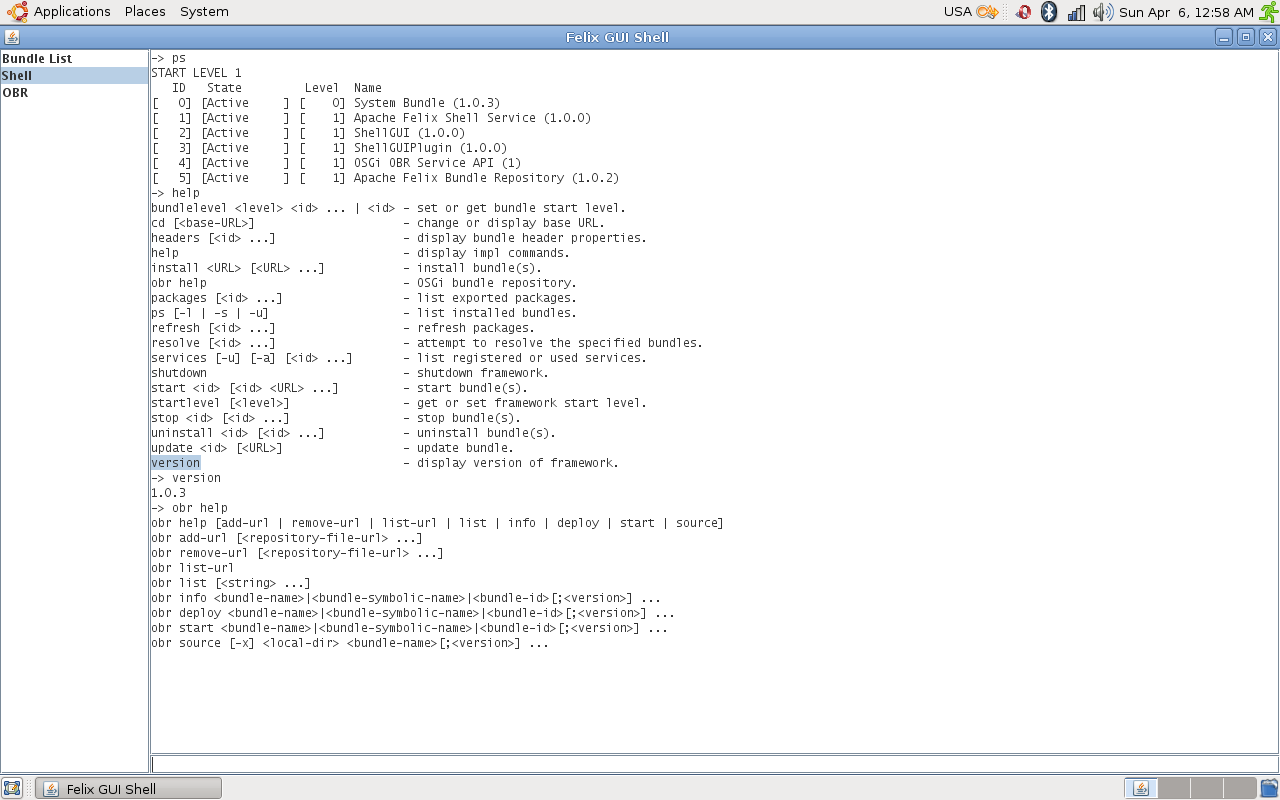
- Screenshot Demonstration of the Apache Felix Shell GUI
- Developer: Apache Software Foundation
- Release: 28 July 2007; 19 years ago
- Stable release: 8.0.0 / October 26, 2026; 21 days ago
- Written in: Java
- Operating system: Cross-platform
- Size: 2.5 MB (zip) / 2.4 MB (tar.gz)
- Type: OSGi Service Platform
- License: Apache License 2.0
- Website: felix.apache.org
- Repository: Felix Repository

Apache Felix is an open source implementation of the OSGi Core Release 6 framework specification. The initial codebase was donated from the Oscar project at ObjectWeb. The developers worked on Felix for a full year and have made various improvements while retaining the original footprint and performance. On June 21, 2007, the project graduated from incubation as a top level project and is considered the smallest size software at Apache Software Foundation.

== Running Felix ==
To run Apache Felix OSGi, you need to download the felix-framework-4.x.x.tar.gz or felix-framework-4.x.x.zip compressed file from the site. Once you have extracted the Felix framework distribution, from the command line in the extracted directory type the following:

java -jar bin/felix.jar

After bundles are installed and running, typing a command like help from the console will display all available commands.

== Version history ==
Felix Framework Distribution

Version	OSGi spec support	Release date
7.0.0	R7	December 25, 2020
6.0.3	R6	May 2, 2019
6.0.2	R6	January 31, 2019
6.0.1	R6	August 20, 2018
5.2.0	R6	September 25, 2015
5.0.1	R6	June 21, 2015
5.0.0	R4	April 24, 2015
4.6.1	R4	March 8, 2015

== Subprojects ==
List of subprojects of which the Apache Felix framework consists.

Component	Latest version	Released
AutoConf Resource Processor	0.1.8	January 16, 2016
Bundle Repository	2.0.10	April 21, 2017
Configuration Admin	1.9.16	June 15, 2019
Connect	0.2.0	May 25, 2018
Configurator	1.0.10	June 15, 2019
Converter	1.0.10	August 26, 2019
Coordinator	1.0.2	November 9, 2015
Dependency Manager 4	r15	December 23, 2018
Deployment Admin	0.9.10	January 16, 2016
Event Admin	1.5.0	May 4, 2018
File Install	3.6.4	October 23, 2017
Framework Security	2.6.1	August 16, 2018
Framework	6.0.3	May 2, 2019
Gogo	5	January 14, 2019
Gogo BOM	1.0.2	January 14, 2019
Gogo Command	1.1.0	January 10, 2019
Gogo JLine	1.1.4	January 28, 2019
Gogo Runtime	1.1.0	January 10, 2019
Gogo Shell	1.1.0	January 10, 2019
Health Check Annotations	2.0.0	February 25, 2019
Health Check API	2.0.2	May 20, 2019
Health Check Core	2.0.6	May 20, 2019
Health Check General Checks	2.0.4	May 13, 2019
Health Check Webconsole Plugin	2.0.0	February 25, 2019
HTTP Service API	3.0.0	August 5, 2015
HTTP Service Base	4.0.8	September 7, 2019
HTTP Service Bridge	4.0.10	September 7, 2019
HTTP Service Bundle	3.0.0	January 29, 2015
HTTP Service Cometd	2.3.2	November 5, 2014
HTTP Service Jetty	4.0.14	September 12, 2019
HTTP Service Proxy	3.0.6	May 15, 2019
HTTP Service Reactor	5	November 5, 2014
HTTP Service SSL filter	1.2.6	October 19, 2018
HTTP Service Whiteboard	4.0.0	April 26, 2018
HTTP Servlet 2.6 + 3.0 API	1.1.2	August 5, 2015
Inventory Printer	1.0.6	December 5, 2017
iPOJO (Core)	1.12.1	December 16, 2014
iPOJO Annotations	1.12.1	December 16, 2014
iPOJO API	1.12.1	December 16, 2014
iPOJO Architecture Command for Gogo	1.12.1	December 16, 2014
iPOJO Architecture Command for the Felix Shell	1.6.0	April 16, 2010
iPOJO BND Plugin	1.12.1	December 16, 2014
iPOJO Composite	1.12.1	December 16, 2014
iPOJO Event Admin handler	1.8.0	May 11, 2011
iPOJO Extender pattern handler	1.4.0	July 21, 2009
iPOJO JMX handler	1.4.0	July 21, 2009
IPOJO Karaf Features	1.12.1	December 16, 2014
iPOJO Manipulator Project (containing all iPOJO manipulator modules)	1.12.1	December 16, 2014
iPOJO Manipulator	1.12.1	December 16, 2014
iPOJO Manipulator BOM	1.12.1	December 16, 2014
iPOJO Maven Plugin	1.12.1	December 16, 2014
iPOJO Metadata	1.6.0	December 6, 2011
iPOJO Runtime Project (containing all iPOJO runtime modules)	1.12.1	December 16, 2014
iPOJO Temporal Dependency handler	1.6.0	May 16, 2010
iPOJO URL Handler	1.6.0	April 16, 2010
iPOJO WebConsole Plugin	1.7.0	May 15, 2013
iPOJO Whiteboard pattern handler	1.6.0	July 3, 2011
Jaas Support Boot Classpath Jar	1.0.2	
Jaas Support Bundle	1.0.2	February 13, 2017
junit4osgi - maven plugin	1.0.0	May 1, 2009
junit4osgi - shell command	1.0.0	May 1, 2009
junit4osgi - swing gui	1.0.0	May 1, 2009
junit4osgi	1.0.0	April 30, 2009
Lightweight HTTP Service Complete	0.1.6	May 5, 2017
Lightweight HTTP Service Core	0.1.6	May 5, 2017
Lightweight HTTP Service Reactor	0.1.6	May 5, 2017
Logback	1.0.2	January 22, 2019
Main	6.0.3	May 2, 2019
Metatype	1.2.2	September 26, 2018
OBR Maven plugin	1.2.0	February 14, 2008
OSGi Check Maven Plugin	0.1.0	September 23, 2018
OSGi OBR service API	1.0.2	Apilr 25, 2008
Preferences	1.1.0	October 12, 2016
Remote Shell	1.2.0	November 25, 2016
Resolver	2.0.0	July 3, 2018
SCR (Declarative Services)	2.1.16	February 26, 2019
SCR Annotations	1.12.0	October 13, 2016
SCR bnd Plugin	1.9.4	May 9, 2019
SCR Compat (Declarative Services)	1.0.4	July 6, 2016
SCR DS Annotations	1.2.10	September 8, 2017
SCR Ext Anno	1.0.0	July 10, 2016
SCR Generator	1.18.2	May 9, 2019
Shell Text UI	1.4.1	October 11, 2009
Shell	1.4.3	March 6, 2012
System Ready	0.4.2	April 5, 2019
UPnP Base Driver (JDK 1.3)	0.8.0	June 12, 2008
UPnP Base Driver (JDK 1.4+)	0.8.0	June 12, 2008
UPnP Extra	0.4.0	May 17, 2009
UPnP Tester	0.4.0	May 17, 2009
User Admin	1.0.4	June 20, 2019
User Admin File-based store	1.0.2	November 30, 2015
User Admin MongoDB-based store	1.0.1	November 30, 2012
Utils	1.11.2	December 11, 2018
Web Console	4.3.14	August 16, 2019
Web Console DS Plugin	2.1.0	September 23, 2018
Web Console Event Plugin	1.1.8	September 26, 2017
Web Console Memory Usage Plugin	1.0.10	April 2, 2019
Web Console OBR Plugin	1.0.4	May 5, 2017
Web Console Package Admin Plugin	1.0.4	February 17, 2017
Web Console Script Console Plugin	1.0.2	November 30, 2015
Web Console Service Diagnostics Plugin	0.1.3	September 16, 2013
Web Console Subsystems Plugin	0.1.0	November 30, 2015
Web Console UPNP Plugin	1.0.6	March 10, 2015
Web Console User Admin Plugin	1.0.2	March 10, 2015

== Projects using Felix ==
The projects listed below highlight the adoption of Apache Felix:

- ServiceMix 4 - An open source ESB with an OSGi core. It also includes JBI support.
- Apache Sling - OSGi-based applications layer for JCR content repositories.
- EasyBeans - open source EJB 3 container.
- GlassFish (v3) - application server for Java EE.
- JOnAS 5 - open source Java EE 5 application server.
- JORAM and JoramMQ - open source messaging: JMS, AMQP and MQTT broker.
- Project Fuji in Open ESB v3 - Light weight and modular ESB core runtime.
- Jitsi (formerly known as SIP Communicator) - open source Java VoIP and multi-protocol instant messenger.
- modulefusion - open source collection for Java enterprise applications.
- NetBeans - The free MultiLanguage IDE.
- SOA Software - API Gateway application from Akana (formerly SOA Software).
- Spring Roo - RAD tool for Java-based enterprise applications
- Opencast Matterhorn - Open Source software to produce, manage and distribute academic audio and video content, especially lecture recordings.
- JIRA - JIRA supports plug-ins as OSGi bundles.
- Adobe Experience Manager - Enterprise content management system and digital asset management developed by Adobe Inc.

== See also ==
- OSGi Alliance
- Apache Aries, a Blueprint Container implementations and extensions of application-focused specifications defined by OSGi Enterprise Expert Group
- Equinox
- Concierge OSGi
