= ProSyst =

- Founded: 1997
- Headquarters: Cologne, Germany
- Area served: Worldwide
- Number of employees: around 120

ProSyst Software GmbH was founded in Cologne in 1997 as a company specializing in Java software and middleware. ProSyst's first commercial application was a Java EE application server. In 2000, the company sold this server technology, and has since focused completely on OSGi solutions.

== History ==
In 1999, ProSyst was among the first companies to join the OSGi Alliance and since then has made important contributions to the development of each release of OSGi specifications (Release 1–4). ProSyst is a member of the OSGi Alliance board of directors alongside IBM, Nokia, NTT, Siemens, Oracle Corporation, Samsung, Motorola and Telcordia. Additionally, members of ProSyst staff serve in several positions on the OSGi Alliance.

ProSyst's focus is on the development of OSGi related software such as Frameworks, Bundles, Remote Management Systems and OSGi tools for developers including a full SDK available for download. ProSyst's OSGi applications are used by SmartHome devices, mobile phone manufacturers, network equipment providers (in CPEs), white goods manufacturers, car manufacturers and in the eHealth market.

ProSyst employs more than 120 Java and OSGi experts and offers OSGi related training, support (SLAs), technical consulting and development services.

As a member, ProSyst contributes to OSGi, Eclipse, Java Community Process, Nokia Forum Pro and the CVTA Connected Vehicle Trade Association.

Prosyst was acquired by Bosch in February 2015, and was merged into Bosch Group's software and systems unit Bosch Software Innovations GmbH.

== Products ==
- Commercial off-the-shelf products around OSGi mBS
- Reduced-size Java client from 1999
