= Peter Fenton (venture capitalist) =

American venture capitalist

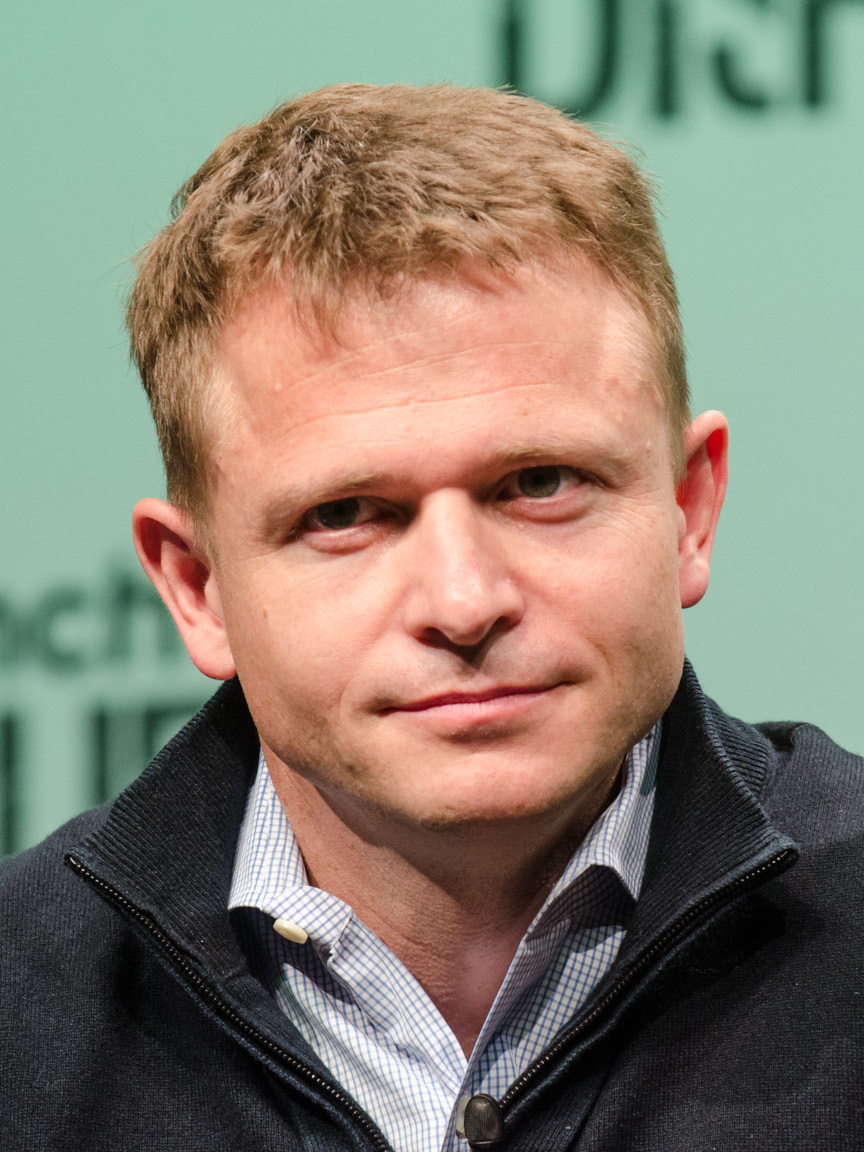
- Fenton in 2013
- Born: July 1972 (age 54)
- Education: Stanford University
- Occupation: Venture capitalist
- Employer: General Partner at Benchmark
- Spouse: Kate Fenton

Peter Fenton (born July 1972) is an American venture capitalist based in Silicon Valley. He is a general partner at Benchmark, a venture capital firm. Fenton has been a perennial member on the Forbes Midas List since 2007, earning the number 2 spot in 2015.

== Education and early career ==
Fenton graduated with a BA in philosophy and an MBA from Stanford University, where he was elected Phi Beta Kappa and an Arjay Miller Scholar, and spent seven years as a partner with Accel Partners. He began his career at Bain & Company and was also an early employee at Virage before joining Benchmark in 2006.

== Career ==
=== Benchmark ===
Fenton's investing style has been summarized as, “Wait until right before the company’s rising ‘adoption curve’ meets the declining ‘risk curve.’” He backed Twitter when it had only 25 employees. He invested early in Yelp in 2006.

Noted for his expertise in open source technology, Fenton has invested in JBoss (acquired by Red Hat), SpringSource (acquired by VMware) and Zimbra, which was later acquired by VMware. The VMware acquisition occurred on the same day that Facebook acquired FriendFeed, another company in Fenton’s portfolio. He led Benchmark's investments in Wily Technology (acquired by CA Technologies), Reactivity (acquired by Cisco), Coremetrics (acquired by IBM), Xensource (acquired by Citrix), Zimbra (acquired by Yahoo!), Minted, Quip (acquired by Salesforce), and Polyvore (acquired by Yahoo).

In December 2014, Fenton "had one of the most unusual days in venture history" when two of his investments, Hortonworks and New Relic, went public the same day. In February 2014, he was awarded the TechCrunch Crunchie for Venture Capitalist of the Year.

=== Board roles ===
Fenton serves on the boards of Airtable, Clickhouse, Cockroach Labs, Digits, Docker (formerly DotCloud), and Sorare.

Fenton has previously served as director for seven IPOs, including Twitter, Elastic, Hortonworks, New Relic, Zendesk, Zuora, and Yelp.
