= Prevalence =

Number of disease cases in a given population at a specific time

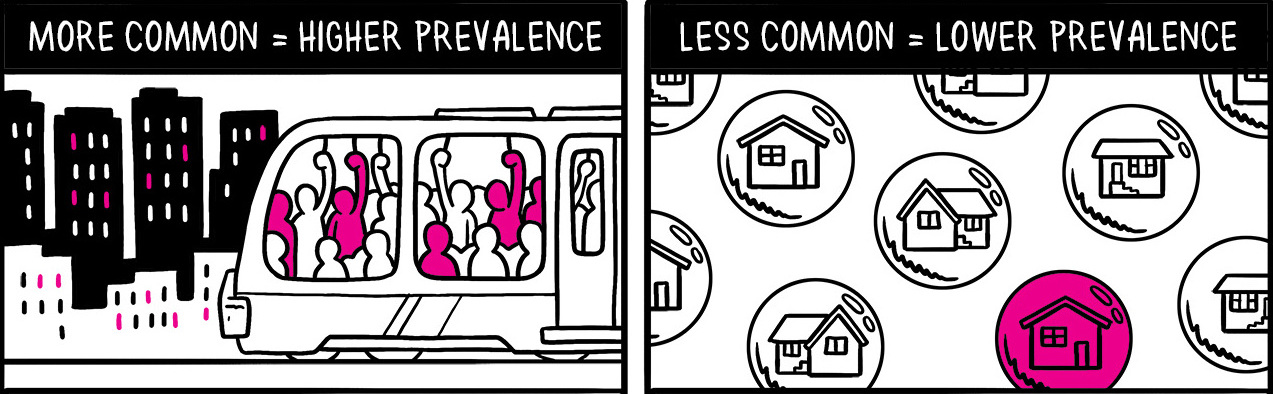
A depiction of prevalence

In epidemiology, prevalence is the proportion of a particular population found to be affected by a medical condition (typically a disease or a risk factor such as smoking or seatbelt use) at a specific time. It is derived by comparing the number of people found to have the condition with the total number of people studied and is usually expressed as a fraction, a percentage, or the number of cases per 10,000 or 100,000 people. Prevalence is most often used in questionnaire studies.

== Difference between prevalence and incidence ==
Prevalence is the number of disease cases present in a particular population at a given time, whereas incidence is the number of new cases that develop during a specified time period. Prevalence answers "How many people have this disease right now?" or "How many people have had this disease during this time period?". Incidence answers "How many people acquired the disease [during a specified time period]?". However, mathematically, prevalence is proportional to the product of the incidence and the average duration of the disease. In particular, when the prevalence is low (<10%), the relationship can be expressed as:

$$Prevalence = incidence \times duration$$

Caution must be practiced as this relationship is only applicable when the following two conditions are met: 1) prevalence is low and 2) the duration is constant (or an average can be taken). A general formulation requires differential equations.

== Examples and utility ==
In science, prevalence describes a proportion (typically expressed as a percentage). For example, the prevalence of obesity among American adults in 2001 was estimated by the U. S. Centers for Disease Control (CDC) at approximately 20.9%.

Prevalence is a term that means being widespread and it is distinct from incidence. Prevalence is a measurement of all individuals affected by the disease at a particular time, whereas incidence is a measurement of the number of new individuals who contract a disease during a particular period of time. Prevalence is a useful parameter when talking about long-lasting diseases, such as HIV, but incidence is more useful when talking about diseases of short duration, such as chickenpox.

== Uses ==
=== Lifetime prevalence ===
Lifetime prevalence (LTP) is the proportion of individuals in a population that at some point in their life (up to the time of assessment) have experienced a "case" (e.g., a disease, a traumatic event, or, a behavior, such as committing a crime). Often, a 12-month prevalence (or some other type of "period prevalence") is provided in conjunction with lifetime prevalence. Point prevalence is the prevalence of disorder at a specific point in time (a month or less). Lifetime morbid risk is "the proportion of a population that might become afflicted with a given disease at any point in their lifetime."

=== Period prevalence ===
Period prevalence is the proportion of the population with a given disease or condition over a specific period of time. It could describe how many people in a population had a cold over the cold season in 2006, for example. It is expressed as a percentage of the population and can be described by the following formula:

Period prevalence (proportion) = Number of cases that existed in a given period ÷ Number of people in the population during this period

The relationship between incidence (rate), point prevalence (ratio) and period prevalence (ratio) is easily explained via an analogy with photography. Point prevalence is akin to a flashlit photograph: what is happening at this instant frozen in time. Period prevalence is analogous to a long exposure (seconds, rather than an instant) photograph: the number of events recorded in the photo whilst the camera shutter was open. In a movie each frame records an instant (point prevalence); by looking from frame to frame one notices new events (incident events) and can relate the number of such events to a period (number of frames); see incidence rate.

=== Point prevalence ===
Point prevalence is a measure of the proportion of people in a population who have a disease or condition at a particular time, such as a particular date. It is like a snapshot of the disease in time. It can be used for statistics on the occurrence of chronic diseases. This is in contrast to period prevalence which is a measure of the proportion of people in a population who have a disease or condition over a specific period of time, say a season, or a year. Point prevalence can be described by the formula: Prevalence = Number of existing cases on a specific date ÷ Number of people in the population on this date

== Limitations ==
It can be said that a very small error applied over a very large number of individuals (that is, those who are not affected by the condition in the general population during their lifetime; for example, over 95%) produces a relevant, non-negligible number of subjects who are incorrectly classified as having the condition or any other condition which is the object of a survey study: these subjects are the so-called false positives; such reasoning applies to the 'false positive' but not the 'false negative' problem where we have an error applied over a relatively very small number of individuals to begin with (that is, those who are affected by the condition in the general population; for example, less than 5%). Hence, a very high percentage of subjects who seem to have a history of a disorder at interview are false positives for such a medical condition and apparently never developed a fully clinical syndrome.

A different but related problem in evaluating the public health significance of psychiatric conditions has been highlighted by Robert Spitzer of Columbia University: fulfillment of diagnostic criteria and the resulting diagnosis do not necessarily imply need for treatment.

A well-known statistical problem arises when ascertaining rates for disorders and conditions with a relatively low population prevalence or base rate. Even assuming that lay interview diagnoses are highly accurate in terms of sensitivity and specificity and their corresponding area under the ROC curve (that is, AUC, or area under the receiver operating characteristic curve), a condition with a relatively low prevalence or base-rate is bound to yield high false positive rates, which exceed false negative rates; in such a circumstance a limited positive predictive value, PPV, yields high false positive rates even in presence of a specificity which is very close to 100%.

== See also ==
- Denominator data
- Rare disease
- Base rate fallacy
