= Spring (company) =

Computer software company

- Type: Subsidiary
- Industry: Computer software
- Founder: Rod Johnson
- Headquarters: Palo Alto, California, USA
- Parent: VMware
- Website: spring.io

Spring (previously known as SpringSource) was a software company founded by Rod Johnson, who also created the Spring Framework, an open-source application framework for enterprise Java applications. VMware purchased Spring for $420 million in August 2009.

== History ==
Originally incorporated by Rod Johnson in 2004 as Interface21, the company was renamed SpringSource in 2007 to better reflect its association with the Spring Framework. Over time, most Spring developers were employed full-time. Spring is open source. The company was eventually renamed Spring.

Spring acquired Covalent Technologies on January 29, 2008, which was then one of the leading contributors to Apache Tomcat.

Several other acquisitions then followed:

- G2One, the company behind Apache Groovy and Grails, acquired in November 2008
- Hyperic, which developed a tool for monitoring Java applications and their environment, acquired in May 2009
- Cloud Foundry, a Platform as a Service provider, acquired in August 2009

Using these acquisitions, the company's business expanded beyond support for its application frameworks, Spring and Grails. It went on to offer a suite of software products across all three stages of the enterprise Java application life cycle: build (develop), run (deploy), and manage. SpringSource created two commercial server products specifically aimed at Spring developers: TC Server, a commercial version of Tomcat integrated with Hyperic for deployment and management, and DM Server, an OSGi based server which never was commercially viable. After spending millions on development with no result, it was subsequently donated to the Eclipse Foundation as the Virgo project. Both servers came with a number of customer support options.

== Acquisition by VMware ==
In August 2009, SpringSource was purchased for $420 million by VMware, where it was maintained for some time as a separate division within VMware. The commercial products were rebadged as the vFabric Application Suite. Acquisitions continued including RabbitMQ (an open-source AMQP message broker), Redis (an open source, noSQL key-value store) and Gemstone (developer of several data-management products). These products (except Redis) also became part of the vFabric product set.

In April 2013, VMware, along with its parent company EMC Corporation, formally created a joint venture (with GE) called Pivotal Software. All of VMware's application-oriented products, including Spring, were transferred to this organization. VMware reacquired Pivotal in 2019 and folded it into the Tanzu application suite.

VMware sold the Gemstone object database products to GemTalk Systems in May 2013. Pivotal ended their sponsorship of Groovy/Grails in March 2015.
