= Apache Aries =

Open-source implementation of Blueprint Container

- Developer: Apache Software Foundation
- Stable release: 0.3 / January 22, 2011
- Repository: svn.apache.org/repos/asf/aries/
- Written in: Java
- Operating system: Cross-platform
- Type: OSGi Blueprint Container implementations
- License: Apache License 2.0
- Website: aries.apache.org

Apache Aries is a project that provides Blueprint Container implementations and extensions for application-focused specifications defined by the OSGi Enterprise Expert Group. The project aims to deliver a set of pluggable Java components that enable an enterprise OSGi application programming model. The Aries project content includes the following:

- WAR to Web Application Bundle Converter
- Blueprint Container
- Java Persistence API integration
- Java Transaction API integration
- Java Management Extensions
- Java Naming and Directory Interface integration
- Application Assembly and Deployment
- Apache Maven Plugin
- META-INF/services handler
- Samples, tutorials, documentation, and integrator's guide

== See also ==
- Virgo (software)
