= Atlantis Entertainment =

- Industry: Media, entertainment
- Founded: 2016
- Founder: Nuno Bettencourt (CEO); Rene Rigal (COO); Steven Schuurman
- Headquarters: Los Angeles, California, United States
- Website: atlantisentertainment.com

Atlantis Entertainment is an American media production company founded in 2016 by Nuno Bettencourt, Rene Rigal, and Steven Schuurman.

== History ==
In 2005 Bettencourt began to consider organizing a concert that would blend music with environmental awareness. His preferred location was a volcanic crater in Sete Cidades, Sao Miguel, Azores as Bettencourt himself was born on the island of Terceira in the Azores. To this end, Atlantis Entertainment commissioned a study of the land to ensure minimal environmental disruption as well as carbon neutrality. The concert was originally planned for 2020, however the COVID-19 pandemic prevented it from taking place.

The concert took place June 23 and 24, 2022. Performing artists included Black Eyed Peas, Bush, Gabriela, Girlfriends, Julian Lennon, Mod Sun, Pigtails, Pitbull, Queen + Adam Lambert (virtual performance), Nicole Scherzinger, Sting (virtual performance), and Stone Temple Pilots. The work of environmental organizations such as The Ocean Cleanup was highlighted during the concert. The concert was also livestreamed via Veeps.
