= OSBP (software factory) =

OSBP (Open Standard Business Platform) is a software factory provided as open-source by the Eclipse Foundation.

== Description ==
OSBP combines no-code/low-code elements with classic software development. Using this technology, coding is largely replaced by a descriptive modeling of the desired software, based on which the factory autonomously generates the necessary program code and all other artifacts. OSBP does not chain developers to no-code/low-code, but allows them to integrate their own source code. The applications thus created can be used independently of platforms and are intended for professional use in companies.

== Objectives ==
OSBP was developed with the aim of minimizing time-consuming or repetitive tasks (such as designing architectures or creating source code). This is not only intended to facilitate and speed up the development process, but also to eliminate notorious sources of error that occur in the "manual work" of coding. Developers report an effort reduction of up to 90 percent with OSBP compared to a conventional approach. In addition, OSBP realizes the benefits of model-driven software development: as the models are independent of the code, you can create modified versions of an application at any time – the software remains flexible and customizable.

== Domain-specific languages ==
OSBP decouples the technical knowledge of programming in its own abstraction layers, which are called domains. For each domain, an abstract model has been defined, the specificity of which is described by means of domain-specific languages (DSL). The individual models are related in a domain architecture, with higher-level models hiding the complexity of the underlying, simplifying the work for the developer. The frameworks used for the respective domains (against which OSBP generates the program code in the final step) can also be exchanged without losing the work previously invested in the description. Currently, OSBP comprises a total of 26 domains (including the developed DSL) and more than 30 integrated open-source frameworks. They contain all the structural elements and functionalities required for a typical application. The domain models as well as the functionality of the open-source factory are expandable for everyone.

== Licences ==
The source code is released as open source under the Eclipse Public License 2.0, so that the use of OSBP does not entail any dependencies – such as a vendor lock-in. In addition, the under professional developers dreaded copyleft effect is excluded.
