= Concierge OSGi =

Concierge
- Stable release: 1.0.0 / April 26, 2009
- Written in: Java
- Operating system: Cross-platform
- Type: OSGi Service Platform R3 implementation
- License: BSD style license
- Website: https://concierge.sourceforge.net/

Concierge is an OSGI (Open Service Gateway Initiative) R3 framework implementation intended for resource-constrained devices like mobile and embedded systems.

Several new version exist and released in an eclipse project on the Eclipse Concierge web site. This one implements RC5 OSGI Specification.

There have been no releases since 2009, so the project can be considered abandoned and obsolete.

== See also ==
- OSGi Alliance
- Apache Felix
- Equinox OSGi

== Bibliography ==
- Rellermeyer, Jan S.; Alonso, Gustavo (March 2007), Concierge: A Service Platform for Resource-Constrained Devices (PDF), ACM EuroSys 2007, archived from the original (PDF) on 2007-08-24
