= Denominator data =

In epidemiology, data or facts about a population are called denominator data or population data. Denominator data are independent of any specific disease or condition. This name is given because in mathematical models of disease, disease-specific data such as the incidence of disease in a population, the susceptibility of the population to a specific condition, the disease resistance, etc. disease-specific variables are expressed as their proportion of some attribute of the general population, and hence appear as the numerator of the fraction or percentage being calculated, general data about the population typically appearing in the denominator; hence the term "denominator data."

In an epidemiological compartment model, for example, variables are often scaled to total population. The susceptible fraction of a population is obtained by taking the ratio of the number of people susceptible to the total population. Susceptibility to a disease may depend on other factors such as age or sex. Data about a population including age distribution, male/female ratios, and other demographic factors may be relevant as denominator data. Denominator data is not only limited to data describing human populations but also includes information about wild and domestic animal populations.

== Value ==
Denominator data is more important in policy making (e.g., predicting how many nurses will be needed in future decades, or how the prevalence of heart disease will increase as a population shifts to have more older people and fewer younger ones) than in clinical trials.

Rates presented without respect to the relevant denominator data can be misleading, and are sometimes derided as floating numerators.

== Sources of data ==
A census is an important source of denominator data. Other sources of population information include health insurance programs, voter registration records, and income tax records. Death certificates and other sources of vital statistics are also sources of denominator data.

In some countries, basic population data has poor quality, so various steps are taken to validate it. This includes comparing national population estimates against the UN's, checking whether the provided data is internally consistent (e.g., if the reported number of pregnancies is higher or lower than the reported number of births), and if the trends in the population are steady. Denominator data can also be checked against surveys and external sources of information (e.g., to see whether the number of deaths reported by the government correlates with the number of coffins sold as reported by the coffin makers); when all sources agree, the data is more likely to be accurate.

== See also ==
- Incidence – Chance over time of a medical condition
- Cumulative incidence – Chance over time of a medical condition
- Prevalence – Number of disease cases in a given population at a specific time
- Attributable risk – Measure in clinical research
- Attributable fraction for the population – Epidemiology statistic
