= Eclipse Grizzly =

Grizzly
- Developer(s): Eclipse Foundation
- Stable release: 4.0.0 / June 15, 2022; 2 years ago
- Repository: github.com/eclipse-ee4j/grizzly
- Written in: Java
- Platform: Java
- Type: Web server framework
- License: EPL 2.0
- Website: eclipse-ee4j.github.io/grizzly/

Grizzly web server framework has been designed to help developers to take advantage of the Java non-blocking I/O (NIO) API. Grizzly's goal is to help developers to build scalable and robust servers using NIO as well as offering extended framework components: web framework (HTTP/S), WebSocket, Comet.

== Overview ==
The Core Framework of Grizzly includes

- Memory Management
- I/O Strategies
- Transports and Connections
- FilterChain and Filters
- Core Configuration
- Port Unification
- JMX Monitoring

HTTP components include

- Core HTTP Framework
- HTTP Server Framework
- HTTP Server Framework Extras
- Comet
- JAXWS
- WebSockets
- AJP
- SPDY
