= Eclipse Gemini =

- Website: eclipse.org/gemini/

The Eclipse Gemini project is an implementation of the OSGi enterprise framework specifications, organized by the Eclipse Foundation. It provides a modular implementation of Java EE specifications. The Gemini project is a collection of separate subprojects, each of which is a standalone project implementing a distinct set of functionality.
