= Rod Johnson (programmer) =

Australian computer specialist

- Education: University of Sydney
- Known for: Spring Framework
- Scientific career
- Fields: Computer Software
- Workplaces: VMware, SpringSource, Neo4j
- Thesis: Piano music in Paris under the July monarchy (1830-1848)

Roderick "Rod" Johnson is an Australian computer specialist who created the Spring Framework and co-founded SpringSource, where he was CEO until its 2009 acquisition by VMware. In 2011, Johnson became chairman of Neo4j Inc. In 2012 it was announced that he joined the Typesafe Inc. board of directors. In 2016, he founded Atomist.

== Biography ==
=== Education ===
Johnson studied at the University of Sydney, graduating in 1992 with a BA Hons (music and computer science). In 1996 he completed a PhD in musicology, also at Sydney, with a thesis entitled 'Piano music in Paris under the July monarchy (1830-1848)'.

=== Career ===
In the early 2000s, Rod Johnson founded SpringSource, and served as CEO until its 2009 acquisition by VMware.

== Publications ==
- 2002. Expert One-on-One J2EE Design and Development. Wrox. ISBN 0-7645-4385-7.
- 2004. Expert One-on-One J2EE Development without EJB. Wrox. ISBN 0-7645-5831-5.
- 2005. Professional Java Development with the Spring Framework. With Juergen Hoeller, Alef Arendsen, Thomas Risberg and Colin Sampaleanu. Wrox. ISBN 0-7645-7483-3.
