= Opencast (software) =

Open source software automating video capture, processing, managing, and distribution

- Stable release: 20.2 (July 15, 2026; 6 days ago)
- Written in: Java, JavaScript
- Available in: 15 languages
- License: ECLv2
- Website: opencast.org
- Repository: github.com/opencast/opencast
- As of: 2021-05-17

Opencast is a free open-source software for automated video capture, processing, managing, and distribution, mainly for academic institutions; it comes with a video portal of its own, a web-based option to produce videos and an editor. Opencast is built by a community of developers in collaboration with universities and organizations worldwide.

== History and community ==
The Opencast community was initiated by the University of California, Berkeley in 2007 to coordinate academic institutions, individuals, and companies interested in the production, management, and distribution of academic video.

The software project, originally named Opencast Matterhorn due to a meeting at ETH Zurich, saw 13 institutions from North America and Europe build a free, open-source software to produce, manage and distribute academic audio and video content, with a focus on lecture recordings. The project received funding from the Hewlett Foundation and the Andrew W. Mellon Foundation. Opencast Matterhorn 1.0 was released in 2010.

With the end of the yearlong funding period, community and project set themselves up as an open-source initiative, driven by the various stakeholders (academic institutions, commercial partners). Coinciding with the release of version 2.0 in the summer of 2015, "Opencast Matterhorn" was rebranded as "Opencast" to denote the end of the (Matterhorn) project and its transformation into an open source product. A year later, Opencast joined the Apereo Foundation. The Foundation is a non-profit organization which fosters use and development of free, open-source software in higher education and serves as legal entity for a series of open-source projects.

== Software and releases ==
Since version 3.0, Opencast uses a major.minor version schema, indicating the major release and the bugfix level. It follows a time-based release cycle, publishing two major releases per year (spring/fall semester), minor bugfix and maintenance releases in between.
