= Equinox (OSGi) =

- Developer(s): Free and open source software community
- Stable release: 4.21 / September 6, 2021; 3 years ago
- Repository: github.com/eclipse-equinox/equinox
- Written in: Java
- Operating system: Cross-platform
- Type: OSGi Service Platform
- License: Eclipse Public License
- Website: https://eclipse.dev/equinox/

In computing, Equinox is a sub-project of the Eclipse project that provides a certified implementation of the OSGi R4.x core framework specification. It is a module runtime that allows developers to implement an application as a set of "bundles" using the common services infrastructure.

Equinox began as a project to replace the original Eclipse plug-in runtime in version 3.0 of Eclipse. It was further developed to meet the needs of the Eclipse community. The adaptations were made into the OSGi specification process, with many being incorporated in the R4 release of the OSGi framework specification. Since then, Equinox has been the reference implementation for the OSGi framework specification.

== See also ==
- Knopflerfish
- Apache Felix
- Concierge OSGi
