= Eclipse Foundation =

Nonprofit association in the European Union

The Eclipse Foundation
- Formation: February 2, 2004
- Type: NPO
- Purpose: advance open source projects, cultivate communities and business ecosystems.
- Headquarters: Schumanplein/Rond-Point Schuman 11, B-1040 Brussels, Belgium
- Members: 300+ members
- Executive Director: Mike Milinkovich
- Website: eclipse.org

The Eclipse Foundation AISBL is an independent, not-for-profit organization chartered in the European Union that acts as a steward of the Eclipse open source software development community. It has over 300 members, and represents the world's largest sponsored collection of Open Source projects and developers. The Foundation focuses on key services such as intellectual property (IP) management, ecosystem development, and IT infrastructure.

The Foundation operates a centralized security program that coordinates vulnerability disclosure and remediation for its projects, publishes security advisories, and maintains policies and procedures for handling reported software vulnerabilities.

In 2025 the Foundation signed an open letter to the technology industry calling for fundamental change in the way the IT infrastructure used to support open source initiatives is funded, operated and maintained.

== History ==
The Eclipse Project was originally created by IBM in November 2001 and was supported by a consortium of software vendors. In 2004, the Eclipse Foundation was founded to lead and develop the Eclipse community. It was created to allow a vendor-neutral, open, and transparent community to be established around Eclipse. The Foundation utilizes a hierarchical project structure. Each project stems from a primary parent project and may have sub-projects. The uppermost projects, which do not have a parent project, are called Top Level Projects. Top-level projects sit at the top of the open source project hierarchy.

The Eclipse Foundation is considered a "third generation" open-source organization, and is home to Jakarta EE, and over 450 open source projects, including runtimes, tools, and frameworks for a wide range of technology domains such as the internet of things (IoT), cloud and edge computing, automotive, systems engineering, software defined vehicles, digital ledger technologies, AI, and open processor designs. The Foundation is best known for developing Eclipse IDE, an IDE primarily targeted at developing in Java. The Foundation as a whole is largely centred around Java development, with more than 65% of its codebase written in Java.

As of January 2026, the Eclipse Foundation hosts more than 450 open-source projects. The Foundation also hosts 20 Industry Collaborations, including groups devoted to the Eclipse IDE, Internet of Things, Software Defined Vehicles and scientific research.

The Eclipse Foundation hosts DemoCamps, Hackathons, and conferences; its flagship event is OCX.

== Projects ==
Eclipse Foundation projects include (in no particular order):

- Eclipse LMOS
- Eclipse Theia
- Eclipse Open VSX
- Eclipse Oniro
- Eclipse Oniro for OpenHarmony (in collaboration with the OpenAtom Foundation)
- OSGi
  - Eclipse Gemini
- OpenHarmony-based Oniro project (in collaboration with OpenAtom Foundation)
- Jetty (web server)
- Jakarta EE
  - Jakarta Enterprise Beans
  - Jakarta Servlets
  - Jakarta Agentic AI
- Eclipse GlassFish
  - EclipseLink
  - Eclipse OpenJ9
  - Eclipse Metro
  - Eclipse Jersey
- Eclipse ThreadX
- Eclipse IDE
  - Eclipse JFace
  - Standard Widget Toolkit
- Eclipse Grizzly (now merged into GlassFish)
- Eclipse Che
- AsciiDoc
- Eclipse Xpanse
- The Eclipse Project
- Eclipse Java development tools
- Eclipse Jetty
- Eclipse Modeling Framework
- Eclipse S-CORE
- Eclipse TractusX
- Eclipse Simulation of Urban Mobility (SUMO)

=== Terminated Projects ===
Projects that become inactive, either through dwindling resources or by reaching their natural conclusion, are terminated by the Eclipse Foundation.

- OSBP (software factory)

=== Specifications ===
The Eclipse Foundation has a specification process. Projects that develop specifications include:

- Jakarta EE Platform
- Sparkplug
- AsciiDoc Language
- Cyber Resilience Attestations
- Eclipse Dataspace Protocol

== Security and Supply Chain Security ==
The Eclipse Foundation maintains a centralized security team and coordinated vulnerability disclosure process for Eclipse Foundation projects. The foundation publishes known vulnerabilities and security advisories affecting hosted projects and infrastructure.

Since 2022, the Eclipse Foundation has partnered with Alpha-Omega. Funding from this partnership enabled the Foundation to launch various initiatives to promote and support Secure Software Supply Chain practices including enforcement of Multi-Factor Authentication for all maintainers, automating generation of source-based SBOMs for all projects, implementing an SLSA-based project badging program, and initiating security audits for high-profile projects.

Through Alpha-Omega, the Eclipse Foundation participated in early access to Anthropic’s Claude Mythos Preview for defensive security work.

== Initiatives ==
The Eclipse Foundation offers various initiatives under a vendor-neutral governance structure that enables members of the Foundation to collaborate on solving industry problems and to drive shared innovation through open source projects.

Notable initiatives include:

=== Eclipse SDV (Software Defined Vehicle) ===
The Eclipse Software Defined Vehicle (SDV) is a Working Group within the Eclipse Foundation that facilitates open source development of automotive software.

Projects focus on building the industry’s first open source software stacks and associated tooling for the core functionality of future mobility.

Notable members include BMW Group, Mercedes Benz Tech Innovation, TRATON Bosch, ZF, Vector, Harman, and Cariad SE.

=== Open Regulatory Compliance (ORC) ===
Open Regulatory Compliance (ORC) is a Working Group within the Eclipse Foundation that brings together key stakeholders in a collaborative effort to work with governmental bodies to meet regulatory requirements, while leveraging open source through the software supply chain.

This working group is preparing the open source community for the implementation of the Cyber Resilience Act.

=== Open VSX ===
The Open VSX Working Group is a Working Group within the Eclipse Foundation that provides governance, guidance, and funding for the communities that support the implementation, deployment, maintenance and adoption of the Eclipse Foundation’s Open VSX Registry at open-vsx.org.

=== Eclipse Dataspace ===
Eclipse Dataspace is a forum for individuals and organizations to build and promote open source software, specifications, and open collaboration models needed to create scalable, modular, extensible, industry-ready open source components based on open standards for dataspaces.

In December 2025 it released two open protocols: the Eclipse Dataspace Protocol (EDP) and Eclipse Dataspace Decentralised Claims Protocol (EDCCP).

Notable members include Microsoft, T-Systems, and Frauenhofer.

=== Eclipse Research Initiatives ===
Research @ Eclipse was founded in 2013. The initiative has participated in 30 research projects with more than 730 partners across, AI, security, cloud, data spaces, software-defined vehicles, embedded, IoT, and open hardware.

It aims to transform technical research projects into open source innovation.

Notable projects include Arrowhead, now Eclipse Arrowhead; APPSTACLE, now Eclipse KUKSA; and BaSys 4.2, now Eclipse BaySx.

=== OpenHW Foundation ===
The OpenHW Foundation is a strategic partnership with the Eclipse Foundation that aims to make open source RISC-V cores the global standard.

It stewards RISC-V IP including CVA6, CVW (Wally), CVE4, CVE2, and CVE5.

Through the Eclipse Foundation, it participates in Horizon Europe research projects including TRISTAN and Rigoletto, and maintains the United RISC-V Access Platform.

Notable members include Thales, Siemens, and Red Hat.

=== Jakarta EE ===
The Jakarta EE Working Group is a Working Group within the Eclipse Foundation for open-source vendor-neutral enterprise Java innovation, bringing together industry-leading organizations across the Java ecosystem to collaborate on advancing the technology

Adoptium

The Adoptium Working Group is a Working Group within the Eclipse Foundation that promotes and supports high-quality runtimes and associated technologies for use across the Java ecosystem, including Eclipse Temurin. It embraces existing standards and a wide variety of hardware and cloud platforms.

== Membership ==
There are four types of membership in the Eclipse Foundation: Strategic, Contributing, Associate, and Committer. Each member organization pays annual dues based on its membership level.

Strategic Members are organizations that invest in developers and other resources to further develop the Eclipse technology. Each strategic member has a representative on the Eclipse Foundation Board of Directors. Strategic Members include the European Space Agency, Microsoft, and Oracle.

Contributing Members are organizations that participate in the development of the Eclipse ecosystem and offer products and services based on, or with, Eclipse. Contributing Members include ARM, BMW Group, NXP, Witekio, and more.

Associate Members are non-voting members who can submit requirements, participate in project reviews, and participate in the Annual Meeting of the Membership at Large and scheduled quarterly update meetings. Committer Members are committers who become full members of the Eclipse Foundation. Committers are the core developers of Eclipse projects and can commit changes to project source code. Committer Members have representation on the board of directors.

A majority of Foundation members contribute to the Foundation by creating new applications and tools based on previous Eclipse applications, while a third of Foundation members interact with multiple Foundation projects.

== See also ==
- List of Eclipse-based software
