= OSGi =

Open standards organisation

- OSGi Alliance logo
- Year started: 1999
- Latest version: 8.0; October 2020
- Organization: OSGi Alliance
- Domain: Java
- License: OSGi Specification License, Version 2.0
- Website: www.osgi.org

OSGi (formerly known as the Open Services Gateway initiative) is an open specification and open source project which describes a modular system and a service platform for the Java programming language that implements a complete and dynamic component model, something that does not exist in standalone Java or VM environments. It has a service-oriented architecture based on micro services each implemented as an extended Java class file archive (JAR (file format)).

The OSGi Alliance, an open standards organization for software founded in March 1999, originally specified and maintained the OSGi standard. The alliance transferred its work to the Eclipse Foundation at the end of 2020.

== Description ==
OSGi is built around a service-oriented architecture. Applications or components, come in the form of bundles for deployment, can be remotely installed, started, stopped, updated, and uninstalled without requiring a reboot. Management of Java packages/classes is specified in great detail. Application life cycle management is implemented via APIs that enable remote downloading of management policies. The service registry enables bundles to detect the addition of new services or the removal of services, and adapt accordingly.

The OSGi specifications have evolved beyond the original focus of service gateways, and are now used in applications ranging from mobile phones to the open-source Eclipse IDE. Other application areas include automobiles, industrial automation, building automation, PDAs, grid computing, entertainment, fleet management and application servers.

In October 2020, the OSGi Alliance announced the transition of the standardization effort to the Eclipse Foundation, subsequent to which it would shut down. All artifacts have been transferred to the Eclipse Foundation, where an “OSGi Working Group" continues to maintain and evolve the specification.

== Specification process ==
The OSGi specification is developed by the members in an open process and made available to the public free of charge under the OSGi Specification License. The OSGi Alliance has a compliance program that is open to members only. As of November 2010, there are seven certified OSGi framework implementations. A separate page lists both certified and non-certified OSGi Specification Implementations, which include OSGi frameworks and other OSGi specifications.

== Architecture ==
OSGi Service Gateway Architecture

OSGi is a Java framework for developing and deploying modular software programs and libraries. Each bundle is a tightly coupled, dynamically loadable collection of classes, jars, and configuration files that explicitly declare their external dependencies (if any).

The framework is conceptually divided into the following areas:

Bundles
Bundles are normal JAR components with extra manifest headers.
Services
The services layer connects bundles in a dynamic way by offering a publish-find-bind model for plain old Java interfaces (POJIs) or plain old Java objects (POJOs).
Services Registry
The application programming interface for management services.
Life-Cycle
The application programming interface for life cycle management (install, start, stop, update, and uninstall) for bundles.
Modules
The layer that defines encapsulation and declaration of dependencies (how a bundle can import and export code).
Security
The layer that handles the security aspects by limiting bundle functionality to pre-defined capabilities.
Execution Environment
Defines what methods and classes are available in a specific platform. There is no fixed list of execution environments, since it is subject to change as the Java Community Process creates new versions and editions of Java. However, the following set is currently supported by most OSGi implementations:
- CDC-1.0/Foundation-1.0
- CDC-1.1/Foundation-1.1
- OSGi/Minimum-1.0
- OSGi/Minimum-1.1
- JRE-1.1
- From J2SE-1.2 up to J2SE-1.6

== Bundles ==
Classification: OSGi

A bundle is a group of Java classes and additional resources equipped with a detailed manifest MANIFEST.MF file on all its contents, as well as additional services needed to give the included group of Java classes more sophisticated behaviors, to the extent of deeming the entire aggregate a component.

Below is an example of a typical MANIFEST.MF file with OSGi Headers:

 Bundle-Name: Hello World
 Bundle-SymbolicName: org.wikipedia.helloworld
 Bundle-Description: A Hello World bundle
 Bundle-ManifestVersion: 2
 Bundle-Version: 1.0.0
 Bundle-Activator: org.wikipedia.Activator
 Export-Package: org.wikipedia.helloworld;version="1.0.0"
 Import-Package: org.osgi.framework;version="1.3.0"

The meaning of the contents in the example is as follows:

1. Bundle-Name: Defines a human-readable name for this bundle, Simply assigns a short name to the bundle.
2. Bundle-SymbolicName: The only required header, this entry specifies a unique identifier for a bundle, based on the reverse domain name convention (used also by the java packages).
3. Bundle-Description: A description of the bundle's functionality.
4. Bundle-ManifestVersion: Indicates the OSGi specification to use for reading this bundle.
5. Bundle-Version: Designates a version number to the bundle.
6. Bundle-Activator: Indicates the class name to be invoked once a bundle is activated.
7. Export-Package: Expresses which Java packages contained in a bundle will be made available to the outside world.
8. Import-Package: Indicates which Java packages will be required from the outside world to fulfill the dependencies needed in a bundle.

== Life-cycle ==
OSGi Bundle Life-Cycle

A Life Cycle layer adds bundles that can be dynamically installed, started, stopped, updated and uninstalled. Bundles rely on the module layer for class loading but add an API to manage the modules in run time. The life cycle layer introduces dynamics that are normally not part of an application. Extensive dependency mechanisms are used to assure the correct operation of the environment. Life cycle operations are fully protected with the security architecture.

Bundle State	Description
INSTALLED	The bundle has been successfully installed.
RESOLVED	All Java classes that the bundle needs are available. This state indicates that the bundle is either ready to be started or has stopped.
STARTING	The bundle is being started, the BundleActivator.start method has been called but the start method has not yet returned. When the bundle has an activation policy, the bundle will remain in the STARTING state until the bundle is activated according to its activation policy.
ACTIVE	The bundle has been successfully activated and is running; its Bundle Activator start method has been called and returned.
STOPPING	The bundle is being stopped. The BundleActivator.stop method has been called but the stop method has not yet returned.
UNINSTALLED	The bundle has been uninstalled. It cannot move into another state.

Below is an example of a typical Java class implementing the BundleActivator interface:

package org.wikipedia;

import org.osgi.framework.BundleActivator;
import org.osgi.framework.BundleContext;

public class Activator implements BundleActivator {
	private BundleContext context;

	@Override
	public void start(BundleContext context) throws Exception {
		System.out.println("Starting: Hello World");
		this.context = context;
	}

	@Override
	public void stop(BundleContext context) throws Exception {
		System.out.println("Stopping: Goodbye Cruel World");
		this.context = null;
	}
}

== Services ==
=== Standard services ===
The OSGi Alliance has specified many services. Services are specified by a Java interface. Bundles can implement this interface and register the service with the Service Registry. Clients of the service can find it in the registry, or react to it when it appears or disappears.

The table below shows a description of OSGi System Services:

System Services	Description
Logging	The logging of information, warnings, debug information or errors is handled through the Log Service. It receives log entries and then dispatches these entries to other bundles that subscribed to this information.
Configuration Admin	This service allows an operator to set and get the configuration information of deployed bundles.
Device Access	Facilitates the coordination of automatic detection and attachment of existing devices. This is used for Plug and Play scenarios.
User Admin	This service uses a database with user information (private and public) for authentication and authorization purposes.
IO Connector	The IO Connector Service implements the CDC/CLDC javax.microedition.io package as a service. This service allows bundles to provide new and alternative protocol schemes.
Preferences	Offers an alternative, more OSGi-friendly mechanism to using Java's default Properties for storing preferences.
Component Runtime	The dynamic nature of services—they can come and go at any time—makes writing software harder. The Component Runtime specification can simplify handling these dynamic aspects by providing an XML based declaration of the dependencies.
Deployment Admin	Standardizes access to some of the responsibilities of the management agent.
Event Admin	Provides an inter-bundle communication mechanism based on a publish-and-subscribe model.
Application Admin	Simplifies the management of an environment with many different types of applications that are simultaneously available.

The table below shows a description of OSGi Protocol Services:

Protocol Services	Description
HTTP Service	Allows information to be sent and received from OSGi using HTTP.
UPnP Device Service	Specifies how OSGi bundles can be developed to interoperate with Universal Plug and Play (UPnP) devices.
DMT Admin	Defines an API for managing a device using concepts from the Open Mobile Alliance (OMA) device management specifications.

The table below shows a description of OSGi Miscellaneous Services:

Miscellaneous Services	Description
Wire Admin	Allows the connection between a Producer service and a Consumer service.
XML Parser	The XML Parser service allows a bundle to locate a parser with desired properties and compatibility with JAXP.
Measurement and State	The Measurement and State service allows and simplifies the correct handling of measurements in an OSGi service platform.

== Organization ==
The OSGi Alliance was founded by Ericsson, IBM, Motorola, Sun Microsystems and others in March 1999. Before incorporating as a nonprofit corporation, it was called the Connected Alliance.

Among its members are (as of February 2015) more than 35 companies from quite different business areas, for example Adobe Systems, Deutsche Telekom, Hitachi, IBM, Liferay, Makewave, NEC, NTT, Oracle, Orange SA, ProSyst, Salesforce, Siemens, Software AG and TIBCO Software.

The Alliance has a board of directors that provides the organization's overall governance. OSGi officers have various roles and responsibilities in supporting the alliance. Technical work is conducted within Expert Groups (EGs) chartered by the board of directors, and non-technical work is conducted in various working groups and committees. The technical work conducted within Expert Groups include developing specifications, reference implementations, and compliance tests. These Expert Groups have produced five major releases of the OSGi specifications (As of 2012).

Dedicated Expert Groups exist for the enterprise, mobile, vehicle and the core platform areas.

The Enterprise Expert Group (EEG) is the newest EG and is addressing Enterprise / Server-side applications. In November 2007 the Residential Expert Group (REG) started to work on specifications to remotely manage residential/home-gateways. In October 2003, Nokia, Motorola, IBM, ProSyst and other OSGi members formed a Mobile Expert Group (MEG) that will specify a MIDP-based service platform for the next generation of smart mobile phones, addressing some of the needs that CLDC cannot manage – other than CDC. MEG became part of OSGi as with R4.

== Specification versions ==
- OSGi Release 1 (R1): May 2000
- OSGi Release 2 (R2): October 2001
- OSGi Release 3 (R3): March 2003
- OSGi Release 4 (R4): October 2005 / September 2006
  - Core Specification (R4 Core): October 2005
  - Mobile Specification (R4 Mobile / JSR-232): September 2006
- OSGi Release 4.1 (R4.1): May 2007 (AKA JSR-291)
- OSGi Release 4.2 (R4.2): September 2009
  - Enterprise Specification (R4.2): March 2010
- OSGi Release 4.3 (R4.3): April 2011
  - Core: April 2011
  - Compendium and Residential: May 2012
- OSGi Release 5 (R5): June 2012
  - Core and Enterprise: June 2012
- OSGi Release 6 (R6): June 2015
  - Core: June 2015
- OSGi Release 7 (R7): April 2018
  - Core and Compendium: April 2018
- OSGi Release 8 (R8): December 2020

== Related standards ==
- MHP / OCAP
- Universal Plug and Play (UPnP)
- DPWS
- ITU-T G.hn
- LonWorks
- CORBA
- CEBus
- EHS (KNX) / CECED CHAIN
- Java Management Extensions

== Current framework implementations ==
Name	License
Apache Felix	Open source
Apache Karaf	Open source
Concierge OSGi	Open source
Equinox OSGi	Open source
Eclipse Gemini	Open Source
Knopflerfish	Open Source
