= Comparison of object–relational mapping software =

This table shows a comparison of notable and available ORM software products.

| Software | Platform | Availability | License | Version | Persistence Specification |
|---|---|---|---|---|---|
| Apache Cayenne | Java | Open source | Apache License 2.0 | 4.2.3 / 2025-11-13; 11 months ago | |
| Dapper | .NET 4.0 | Open source | Apache License 2.0 | 1.8 NuGet | |
| DataNucleus | Java | Open source | Apache License 2 | 4.1.0.RELEASE / May 19, 2015 | JDO |
| DBIx::Class | Perl | Open source | Artistic License 1.0 & GPL | 0.082843 / May 17, 2022 | |
| Django | Python | Open source | BSD licenses | 6.1.2 6 October 2026; 10 days ago | |
| Doctrine | PHP | Open source | MIT | 2.14.1 / January 16, 2023 | |
| EclipseLink | Java | Open source | Eclipse Public License Version 1.0 (EPL) and Eclipse Distribution License Version 1.0 (EDL) | 2.4.2 / July 4, 2013 | JPA 2.0 |
| Entity Framework Core | .NET | Open Source | Apache License 2.0 | 6.0 / November 10, 2021 | |
| Hibernate | Java | Open source | GNU Lesser General Public License | 5.4.31 / April 30, 2021 | JPA 2.0 |
| MyBatis/iBATIS | Cross-platform | Open source | Apache License 2.0 | | |
| jOOQ | Java | Open source | Apache License 2.0 and Proprietary License | 3.2.0 / October 9, 2013 | |
| Microsoft ADO.NET Entity Framework | .NET Framework 4.5 | Part of .NET 4.5 | Apache License 2.0 | v6.0 (2014) | |
| nHibernate | .NET Framework 4.6.1 | Open source | GNU Lesser General Public License | 5.3.12 (2022-05-01) | |
| RedBeanPHP | PHP | Open source | BSD License | 2026-04-30; 5 months ago 5.7.6 | |
| SQLAlchemy | Python | Open source | MIT License | 2026-10-07; 9 days ago 2.1.4 | |
| SQLObject | Python | Open source | LGPL | 2026-10-16 / 3.14.0 | |
| Skipper | PHP | Commercial | Proprietary software | 3.0 | |
| Storm | Python | Open source | LGPL 2.1 | 0.20 / June 28, 2013 | |
| TopLink | Java | Commercial | Oracle License | 10g | JPA |

== See also ==
- List of object–relational mapping software
- Object–relational mapping
