= Mapper =

Mapper may refer to:

== Computers ==
- MAPPER, a Fourth-generation programming language originally sold by Sperry Corporation (now Unisys)
- Mapper(2), a biological database

-OR-

- DataMapper, a software library written in the Ruby language
- Device mapper, handler for Linux
- Data mapper pattern, a software engineering architectural term
- Global Mapper, a Global Information System software package developed by Blue Marble Geographics that runs on Microsoft Windows
- Memory management controller, a chip that handles bank switching on certain NES cartridges, or the part of an emulator that emulates a Memory Management Controller
- Object–relational mapping, a computer science programming technique
- Port mapper, maps program to web address
- Semantic mapper, maps between namespaces
- Mapper, a variant (or perhaps a generalization?) of Reeb graphs and merge trees used for visualization in topological data analysis

== Other ==
- Level designer, a person who designs levels for video games
- Moon Mineralogy Mapper, one of two instruments that NASA contributed to India's first mission to the Moon, Chandrayaan-1, launched October 22, 2008
- Thematic Mapper, one of the Earth observing sensors introduced in the Landsat program
- Wisconsin H-Alpha Mapper, a custom-built 0.6 metres (24 in) telescope operated by the University of Wisconsin–Madison, used to study the Helium-alpha ions of the warm ionized medium
