= Persistence =

Persistence or Persist may refer to:

== Math and computers ==
- Image persistence, in LCD monitors
- Persistence (computer science), the characteristic of data that outlives the execution of the program that created it
- Persistence of a number, a mathematical property
- Persistent data structure, a data structure that always preserves the previous version of itself when it is modified
- Persistent world, in virtual reality and computer games

== Science ==
- Multidrug tolerance, a dormant, persistent state of a bacterial population
- Persistence (botany), describing plant parts that remain attached to the plant after completing their function
- Persistence (discontinuity), a concept in geotechnical engineering
- Persistence (linguistics), a principle of grammaticalization
- Persistence (psychology), a personality trait
- Persistence of vision, a theory on how the illusion of motion in films is achieved
- Persistence forecasting, predicting the future to be the same as the present

== Other ==
- Persistence (log canoe), an 1890s Chesapeake Bay log canoe
- Persist, Oregon, a ghost town in Jackson County, U.S.
- Persistence, a 2005 demo by Konkhra
- The Persistence, a first-person horror game developed by Firesprite
- Persistence the rover
- Persist (Java tool), a Java-based ORM/DAO tool
- "Persistence", a song by King Gizzard & the Lizard Wizard from Omnium Gatherum

== See also ==
- Persistent (disambiguation)
- The Persistence of Memory (disambiguation)
