= JOOQ Object Oriented Querying =

jOOQ
- Developer(s): Data Geekery GmbH
- Stable release: 3.20.5 / June 11, 2025; 56 days ago
- Repository: github.com/jOOQ/jOOQ
- Written in: Java
- Operating system: Cross-platform
- Platform: Java
- Type: Object–relational mapping
- License: Dual-licensed: Apache-2.0 and commercial
- Website: www.jooq.org

jOOQ Object Oriented Querying, commonly known as jOOQ, is a light database-mapping software library in Java that implements the active record pattern. Its purpose is to be both relational and object oriented by providing a domain-specific language to construct queries from classes generated from a database schema.

== Paradigm ==
jOOQ claims that SQL should come first in any database integration. Thus, it does not introduce a new textual query language, but rather allows for constructing plain SQL from jOOQ objects and code generated from a database schema. jOOQ uses JDBC to call the underlying SQL queries.

While it provides abstraction on top of JDBC, jOOQ does not have as much functionality and complexity as standard object–relational mapping libraries such as EclipseLink or Hibernate.

jOOQ's closeness to SQL has advantages over typical object–relational mapping libraries. SQL has many features that cannot be used in an object oriented programming paradigm; this set of differences is referred to as the object–relational impedance mismatch. By being close to SQL, jOOQ helps to prevent syntax errors and type mapping problems. Also, variable binding is taken care of. It is also possible in jOOQ to create very complex queries, that involve aliasing, unions, nested selects and complex joins. jOOQ also supports database-specific features, such as UDTs, enum types, stored procedures and native functions.

== Example ==
A nested query selecting from an aliased table

-- Select authors with books that are sold out
SELECT * FROM AUTHOR a
      WHERE EXISTS (SELECT 1
                 FROM BOOK
                WHERE BOOK.STATUS = 'SOLD OUT'
                  AND BOOK.AUTHOR_ID = a.ID);

And its equivalent in jOOQ DSL:

// Use the aliased table in the select statement
create.selectFrom(table("AUTHOR").as("a"))
      .where(exists(selectOne()
                   .from(table("BOOK"))
                   .where(field("BOOK.STATUS").equal(field("BOOK_STATUS.SOLD_OUT")))
                   .and(field("BOOK.AUTHOR_ID").equal(field("a.ID")))));

Or more simply, using code generation from the database metadata to generate constants:

// Use the aliased table in the select statement
final Author a = AUTHOR.as("a");

create.selectFrom(a)
      .where(exists(selectOne()
                   .from(BOOK)
                   .where(BOOK.STATUS.equal(BOOK_STATUS.SOLD_OUT))
                   .and(BOOK.AUTHOR_ID.equal(a.ID))));

== See also ==
- Apache Calcite
- List of object–relational mapping software
- SQL/OLB
