= List of object–relational mapping software =

This is a list of well-known object–relational mapping software.

== Java ==
- Apache Cayenne, open-source for Java
- Apache OpenJPA, open-source for Java
- DataNucleus, open-source JDO and JPA implementation (formerly known as JPOX)
- Ebean, open-source ORM framework
- EclipseLink, Eclipse persistence platform
- Enterprise JavaBeans (EJB)
- Enterprise Objects Framework, Mac OS X/Java, part of Apple WebObjects
- Hibernate, open-source ORM framework, widely used
- Java Data Objects (JDO)
- JOOQ Object Oriented Querying (jOOQ)
- Kodo, commercial implementation of both Java Data Objects and Java Persistence API
- TopLink by Oracle

== iOS ==
- Core Data by Apple for Mac OS X and iOS

== .NET ==
- Base One Foundation Component Library, free or commercial
- Dapper, open source
- Entity Framework, included in .NET Framework 3.5 SP1 and above
- iBATIS, free open source, maintained by ASF but now inactive.
- LINQ to SQL, included in .NET Framework 3.5
- NHibernate, open source

== Objective-C, Cocoa ==
- Enterprise Objects, one of the first commercial OR mappers, available as part of WebObjects
- Core Data, object graph management framework with several persistent stores, ships with Mac OS X and iOS

== Perl ==
- DBIx::Class

== PHP ==
- Laravel, framework that contains an ORM called "Eloquent" an ActiveRecord implementation.
- Doctrine, open source ORM for PHP, Free software (MIT)
- CakePHP, ORM and framework, open source (scalars, arrays, objects); based on database introspection, no class extending
- CodeIgniter, framework that includes an ActiveRecord implementation
- Yii, ORM and framework, released under the BSD license. Based on the ActiveRecord pattern
- FuelPHP, ORM and framework for PHP, released under the MIT license. Based on the ActiveRecord pattern.
- Laminas, framework that includes a table data gateway and row data gateway implementations
- Qcodo, ORM and framework, open source
- Redbean, ORM layer for PHP, for creating and maintaining tables on the fly, open source, BSD
- Skipper, visualization tool and a code/schema generator for PHP ORM frameworks, commercial

== Python ==
- Django, ActiveRecord ORM included in Django framework, open source
- SQLAlchemy, open source, a Data Mapper ORM
- SQLObject, open source
- Storm, open source (LGPL 2.1) developed at Canonical Ltd.
- Tryton, open source
- web2py, the facilities of an ORM are handled by the DAL in web2py, open source
- Odoo – Formerly known as OpenERP, It is an Open Source ERP in which ORM is included.

== Ruby ==
- ActiveRecord
- DataMapper
- iBATIS (inactive)

== Smalltalk ==
- TOPLink/Smalltalk, by Oracle, the Smalltalk predecessor of the Java version of TOPLink

== See also ==
- Comparison of object–relational mapping software
