= Persistent =

Persistent may refer to:

- Persistent data
- Persistent data structure
- Persistent identifier
- Persistent memory
- Persistent organic pollutant
- Persistent Systems, a technology company
- USS Persistent, three United States Navy ships

== See also ==
- The Persistence of Memory (disambiguation)
- Persistence (disambiguation)
