= Tph =

TPH or tph may refer to:

- Walther TPH, a semi-automatic pistol made by the German arms manufacturer Walther
- Tai Po Hospital, a hospital in Tai Po, Hong Kong
- Tryptophan hydroxylase, an enzyme
- Total Petroleum Hydrocarbon, an expression of chemical content
- Table per hierarchy or Single Table Inheritance, a pattern in computer science by which object graphs are mapped onto single database tables
- Tudor, Pickering, Holt & Co., an investment and merchant bank headquartered in Houston, Texas, USA.
- tph: trains per hour, a measure of the frequency of passenger rail transport services
- The Project Hate MCMXCIX, a Swedish metal band
- Tonopah Airport (IATA: TPH, ICAO: KTPH)
