= RedBeanPHP =

- Stable release: 5.7 / April 3, 2021
- Written in: PHP
- Operating system: Cross-platform
- Type: Object–relational mapping library
- License: BSD GPLv2
- Website: redbeanphp.com
- Repository: github.com/gabordemooij/redbean

RedBeanPHP is an independent, free, BSD licensed, open-source object–relational mapping (ORM) software written by Gabor de Mooij. It is a stand-alone library, not part of any framework. RedBeanPHP is an on-the-fly object–relational mapper, this means there is no upfront configuration. The system relies on conventions entirely and adapts the database schema to fit the needs of the program. This way, it strikes a balance between NoSQL and traditional RDBMS solutions.

== Features ==
RedBeanPHP is different from other ORM systems because it requires no configuration in XML, YAML or JSON. It adapts the database schema based on the needs of the program. All tables and columns are created on-the-fly, without upfront configuration or mapping. It automatically adds columns to tables if necessary and changes the type of the column to match its content requirements. When the developer is done developing and no more schema changes are expected, the schema can be frozen for deployment to production environments. After freezing the database no more schema alterations take place. Relations among tables are mapped in the same way: by convention. For instance, to create a one-to-many relationship between two tables one assigns an array to the property bearing the name of the target table. This automatically creates the table as well as the required columns.

Code example, demonstrating a simple CRUD operation and a relation:

R::setup();
$movie = R::dispense('movie');
$movie->title = 'Beans in space';
$character = R::dispense('character');
$character->name = 'hero';
$movie->ownCharacterList[] = $character;
$id = R::store($movie);

== Influence ==
RedBeanPHP is the first library known to adopt the on-the-fly approach towards ORM. As such it has a big influence on other libraries. RedBeanPHP inspired many other projects to embrace this approach towards object mapping. Similar libraries have appeared for .NET, Python, JavaScript, Java, Erlang, ColdFusion and Objective-C.

== Integration ==
While being an independent library, plugin modules have been developed for various popular frameworks like: Laravel, CodeIgniter, Kohana, Silex and Zend Framework. Besides integration modules, some frameworks ship with RedBeanPHP out-of-the-box like The Nibble Framework.

== History ==
RedBeanPHP first appeared in 2009 on GitHub. The first publicly available version was 0.3.3. RedBeanPHP has been developed by Gabor de Mooij, a software developer from the Netherlands. Because RedBeanPHP is very accessible and it does not hide the SQL language it is used by Universities to teach database programming. According to a forum post by Gabor himself the library has been inspired by a rant about object relational mapping systems by Ted Neward called the 'ORM, Vietnam of computer science'.

== Reception ==
Based on the reviews and presentations available on the web, the overall reception of RedBeanPHP seems to be positive. However the library is less suitable for projects with existing databases and does not support custom table and column mappings, for instance it is not possible to use table prefixes. Also, none of the major frameworks has incorporated the library.

== See also ==
- Doctrine
- List of object–relational mapping software
