= ADODB =

ADODB may refer to:

- ActiveX Data Objects, a Microsoft API for data access
- ADOdb Lite, a database abstraction library written in PHP
