= DataMapper =

Software library

DataMapper is an object-relational mapper library written in Ruby that follows the active record pattern even though the name implies it follows the data mapper pattern. While DataMapper 1 may not have achieved total decoupling between object and database suggested by the data mapper pattern, it appears DataMapper 2 intended to change this (a la Virtus, a library adapted from DataMapper). The DataMapper 2 project was renamed before launch and was released as Ruby Object Mapper (ROM) in August 2013.

Some features of DataMapper:

- Eager loading of child associations to avoid (N+1) queries
- Lazy loading of select properties, e.g., larger fields
- Query chaining, and not evaluating the query until absolutely necessary (using a lazy array implementation)
- An API not too heavily oriented to SQL databases

DataMapper was designed to be a more abstract ORM, not strictly SQL, based on Martin Fowler's enterprise pattern. As a result, DataMapper adapters have been built for other non-SQL databases, such as CouchDB, Apache Solr, and webservices such as Salesforce.com.
