= Passive data structure =

Another term for record

In computer science and object-oriented programming, a passive data structure (PDS), also termed a plain old data structure or plain old data (POD), is a record, in contrast with objects. It is a data structure that is represented only as passive collections of field values (instance variables), without using object-oriented features.

== Rationale ==
Passive data structures are appropriate when there is a part of a system where it should be clearly indicated that the detailed logic for data manipulation and integrity are elsewhere. PDSs are often found at the boundaries of a system, where information is being moved to and from other systems or persistent storage and the problem domain logic that is found in other parts of the system is irrelevant. For example, PDS would be convenient for representing the field values of objects that are being constructed from external data, in a part of the system where the semantic checks and interpretations needed for valid objects are not applied yet.

== In C++ ==
A PDS type in C++, or Plain Old C++ Object, is defined as either a scalar type or a PDS class. A PDS class has no user-defined copy assignment operator, no user-defined destructor, and no non-static data members that are not themselves PDS. Moreover, a PDS class must be an aggregate, meaning it has no user-declared constructors, no private nor protected non-static data, no virtual base classes (Note: A PDS class can have a base class whose first non-static data members differs.) and no virtual functions. The standard includes statements about how PDS must behave in C++. The type_traits library in the C++ Standard Library provides a template named is_pod that can be used to determine whether a given type is a POD. In C++20 the notion of “plain old data” (POD) and by that is_pod is deprecated and replaced with the concept of “trivial” and “standard-layout” types.

In some contexts, C++ allows only PDS types to be used. For example, a union in C++98 cannot contain a class that has virtual functions or nontrivial constructors or destructors. This restriction is imposed because the compiler cannot determine which constructor or destructor should be called for a union. PDS types can also be used for interfacing with C, which supports only PDS.

== In Java ==
In Java, some developers consider that the PDS concept corresponds to a class with public data members and no methods (Java Code Conventions 10.1), i.e., a data transfer object. Others would also include Plain old Java objects (POJOs), a class that has methods but only getters and setters, with no logic, and JavaBeans to fall under the PDS concept if they do not use event handling and do not implement added methods beyond getters and setters. However, POJOs and Java Beans have encapsulation, and so violate the fundamental definition of PDS.

Records (introduced in Java 16, in 2021) are shallowly immutable carriers of data without encapsulation, and therefore they can also be considered PDS.

== In other languages ==
In PHP, associative arrays and stdClass objects can be considered PDS.

Other structured data representations such as XML or JSON can also be used as a PDS if no significant semantic restrictions are used.

In Python, dataclass module provides dataclasses - often used as behaviourless containers for holding data, with options for data validation. The dataclasses in Python, introduced in version 3.7, that provide a convenient way to create a class and store data values. The data classes use to save our repetitive code and provide better readability.

In C, structs are used in the same manner.

== See also ==
- Plain old CLR object
