= Dapper ORM =

Object-relational database software

Dapper
- Original author: Stack Overflow
- Stable release: 2.1.44 / April 12, 2024; 2 years ago
- Written in: C#
- Operating system: Cross-platform
- Platform: .NET 4.6.1 and .NET Standard 2.0
- Type: Object–relational mapping
- License: Apache License 2.0
- Website: github.com/DapperLib/Dapper
- Repository: github.com/DapperLib/Dapper

Dapper is an object–relational mapping (ORM) product for the Microsoft .NET platform. It provides a framework for mapping an object-oriented domain model to a traditional relational database. Its purpose is to relieve the developer from a significant portion of relational data persistence-related programming tasks. Dapper is free as open source software that is distributed under the Apache License 2.0.

Dapper was originally developed for and by Stack Overflow.

== Feature summary ==
The Dapper team advertises the following features:

- Speedy and high performance
- Choice of static/dynamic object binding
- Handling of SQL query
- Multiple query support
- Support and handling of stored procedures

== Read also ==
- List of object–relational mapping software
- .NET Persistence API (NPA)
