= ADOdb Lite =

Database abstraction library for PHP

- Stable release: 1.42 / January 11, 2007
- Written in: PHP
- Type: Database abstraction layer
- License: LGPL
- Website: sourceforge.net/projects/adodblite/

ADOdb Lite is a very small, fast ADOdb-compatible database abstraction library written in PHP.

It uses less than 100 kB of system RAM for each HTTP access compared to over 640 kB for ADOdb. After a benchmark ADOdb Lite is also 300% faster than the ADOdb library.

== Supported databases ==
- FrontBase
- Gladius
- MaxDB
- Mini SQL
- MS SQL
- MS SQL Pro
- MySQL
- MySQL Improved
- MySQL w/transactions
- PostgreSQL
- SQLite
- SQLite Pro
- Sybase
- Sybase ASE

The ADOdb Lite library is fully expandable through the use of modules. The library contains a PEAR module that contains PEAR DB-compatible commands. The library also contains a Transaction module giving full transaction support to many of the supported databases. The library can support any number of user created modules to easily expand the library. The module system also gives the programmer/admin the ability to structure the library usage based upon the needs of the website.

The library is very fast compared to other database abstraction libraries.
