= .NET Persistence API =

The .NET Persistence API, also referred to as NPA, is a persistence and object–relational mapping (ORM) specification for the .NET framework.

NPA is based on the Java Persistence API (JPA), which is the standard persistence API in the Java world. NPA follows JPA by providing a complete persistence API and a rich set of ORM features.

== Motivation ==
The main purposes of the .NET Persistence API (NPA) are:

- To provide a vendor-free persistence API for .NET, making switching from one persistence provider to another easier (avoiding vendor lock-in).
- To provide a cross-language persistence API by extending the popular Java Persistence API (JPA) to all the .NET programming languages.

== Technology ==
The main features of NPA include:

- Object-oriented API for working against databases (usually RDBMS).
- Query language, based on SQL, for retrieving data from the database in an object oriented manner.
- Support of persisting POCO (plain old CLR objects) objects (entities).
- Two methods for marking classes as entity classes and for specifying other settings:
  - Using attributes – meta data is embedded in class definitions in the source code.
  - Using external XML – meta data is specified in external XML resource files.

== Implementations ==
NPA is a persistence specification. To use NPA an implementation of the specification is required. Persistence and ORM vendors can provide their own implementations of NPA.

First implementation, NPA for NHibernate, was released in December 2011.
