= Plain old CLR object =

Concept in software engineering

In software engineering, a plain old CLR object, or plain old class object (POCO) is a simple object created in the .NET Common Language Runtime (CLR) that is unencumbered by inheritance or attributes. This is often used in opposition to the complex or specialized objects that object–relational mapping frameworks often require. In essence, a POCO does not have any dependency on an external framework.

== Etymology ==
Plain Old CLR Object is a play on the term plain old Java object from the Java EE programming world, which was coined by Martin Fowler in 2000. POCO is often expanded to plain old C# object, though POCOs can be created with any language targeting the CLR. An alternative acronym sometimes used is plain old .NET object.

== Benefits ==
Some benefits of POCOs are:

- allows a simple storage mechanism for data, and simplifies serialization and passing data through layers;
- goes hand-in-hand with dependency injection and the repository pattern;
- minimised complexity and dependencies on other layers (higher layers only care about the POCOs, POCOs don't care about anything) which facilitates loose coupling;
- increases testability through simplification.

== See also ==
- Plain old data structure
- Plain old Java object
- Data transfer object
