= Abstraction inversion =

Computer programming anti-pattern

In computer programming, abstraction inversion is an anti-pattern arising when users of a construct need functions implemented within it but not exposed by its interface. The result is that the users re-implement the required functions in terms of the interface, which in its turn uses the internal implementation of the same functions. This may result in implementing lower-level features in terms of higher-level ones, thus the term 'abstraction inversion'.

Possible ill-effects are:

- The user of such a re-implemented function may seriously underestimate its running-costs.
- The user of the construct is forced to obscure their implementation with complex mechanical details.
- Many users attempt to solve the same problem, increasing the risk of error.

== Examples ==
Alleged examples from professional programming circles include:

- In Ada, choice of the rendezvous construct as a synchronisation primitive forced programmers to implement simpler constructs such as semaphores on the more complex basis.
- Applesoft BASIC and Lua (when configured for desktop computers) have a floating-point as the base numeric type. While Applesoft did implement integer arithmetic, it was implemented on top of floating-point arithmetic, and neither had any bitwise operators (Lua added support in Lua 5.2) Applesoft also had no support for blitting of raster graphics (even though the language supported vector graphics on the Apple II's raster hardware). This caused games and other programs written in Applesoft to run slower.
- Creating an object to represent a function is cumbersome in object-oriented languages such as Java and C++ (especially prior to C++11 and Java 8), in which functions are not first-class objects. In C++ it is possible to make an object 'callable' by overloading the () operator, but it is still often necessary to implement a new class, such as the Functors in the STL. (C++11's lambda function makes it much easier to create an object representing a function.)
- Tom Lord has suggested that Subversion version control system pays for the abstraction inversion of implementing a write-only database on a read/write database with poor performance.
- Using stored procedures to manipulate data in a relational database, without granting programmers right to deploy such procedures, leads to reimplementing queries outside the database. For example, large datasets (in extreme cases - whole tables) are fetched and actual filtering takes place in application code. Alternatively, thousands of rows are updated (inserted or even fetched) one by one instead of running a multiple row query.
- Microsoft's WinUI 3 systematically replaces the title bar of the windows it creates with a custom one that ignores the end-user's color settings, always appearing gray instead. Applying the end-user's chosen color to the title bar requires using further customization code on Windows 11, and completely replacing the custom title bar with another custom one on Windows 10.

Examples that are common outside professional programming circles include:

- Using spreadsheet lookup functions to replicate the functionality of a database
- Using variant data types as loop counters in Microsoft Visual Basic where an integer type is also available.

== See also ==
- Leaky abstraction
