= USS Persistent =

USS Persistent is a name used more than once by the United States Navy:

- USS Persistent (PYc-48), a coastal patrol yacht commissioned 16 October 1940.
- USS Persistent (MSO-491), a fleet minesweeper commissioned 3 February 1956.
- USNS Persistent (T-AGOS-6), a Stalwart-class ocean surveillance ship that operated during the 1980s.
