= Mapper(2) =

Database of transcription factor binding sites

MAPPER2

Content
- Description: multi-genome catalog of putative transcription factor binding sites.

Contact
- Laboratory: Department of Molecular Genetics and Microbiology.
- Authors: Alberto Riva
- Primary citation: Riva & al. (2012)
- Release date: 2005

Access
- Website: http://genome.ufl.edu/mapperdb

Mapper(2) is a database of transcription factor binding sites in multiple genomes.

== See also ==
- Transcription factor
