= The Persistence of Memory (disambiguation) =

The Persistence of Memory is the name of a painting by Salvador Dalí.

The Persistence of Memory may also refer to:

- The Persistence of Memory (novel), a novel by Tony Eprile
- "The Persistence of Memory" (short story), a short story by Gael Baudino
- "The Persistence of Memory" (Cosmos: A Personal Voyage), an episode of Cosmos: A Personal Voyage
- The Persistence of Memory (album), a 2021 album by Emigrate

Persistence of Memory may refer to:

- Persistence of Memory (2008 novel), a novel by Amelia Atwater-Rhodes
- Persistent memory, computer memory that stores data which outlives the process that created it
- Persistence (computer science), a state in which memory outlives the process that created it
