= Actuate =

Actuate may refer to:

- Actuate Corporation
- The action of an actuator
