= Interpreter (computing) =

Software that executes source code directly

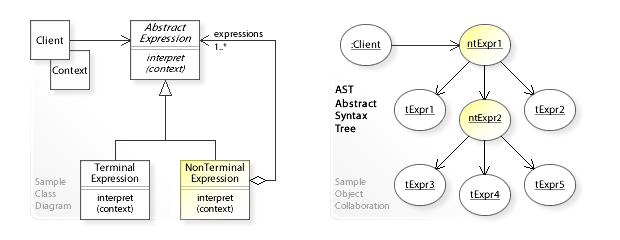
W3sDesign Interpreter Design Pattern UML

In computing, an interpreter is software that executes source code without first compiling it to machine code. An interpreted runtime environment differs from one that processes CPU-native executable code which requires translating source code before executing it. An interpreter may translate the source code to an intermediate format, such as bytecode. A hybrid environment may translate the bytecode to machine code via just-in-time compilation, as in the case of .NET and Java, instead of interpreting the bytecode directly.

Before the widespread adoption of interpreters, the execution of computer programs often relied on compilers, which translate and compile source code into machine code. Early runtime environments for Lisp and BASIC could parse source code directly. Thereafter, runtime environments were developed for languages (such as Perl, Raku, Python, MATLAB, and Ruby), which translated source code into an intermediate format before executing to enhance runtime performance.

Code that runs in an interpreter can be run on any platform that has a compatible interpreter. The same code can be distributed to any such platform, instead of an executable having to be built for each platform. Although each programming language is usually associated with a particular runtime environment, a language can be used in different environments. Interpreters have been constructed for languages traditionally associated with compilation, such as ALGOL, Fortran, COBOL, C and C++.

== History ==
In the early days of computing, compilers were more commonly found and used than interpreters because hardware at that time could not support both the interpreter and interpreted code and the typical batch environment of the time limited the advantages of interpretation.

Interpreters were used as early as 1952 to ease programming within the limitations of computers at the time (e.g. a shortage of program storage space, or no native support for floating point numbers). Interpreters were also used to translate between low-level machine languages, allowing code to be written for machines that were still under construction and tested on computers that already existed. The first interpreted high-level language was Lisp. Lisp was first implemented by Steve Russell on an IBM 704 computer. Russell had read John McCarthy's paper, "Recursive Functions of Symbolic Expressions and Their Computation by Machine, Part I", and realized (to McCarthy's surprise) that the Lisp eval function could be implemented in machine code. The result was a working Lisp interpreter which could be used to run Lisp programs, or more properly, "evaluate Lisp expressions".

The development of editing interpreters was influenced by the need for interactive computing. In the 1960s, the introduction of time-sharing systems allowed multiple users to access a computer simultaneously, and editing interpreters became essential for managing and modifying code in real-time. The first editing interpreters were likely developed for mainframe computers, where they were used to create and modify programs on the fly. One of the earliest examples of an editing interpreter is the EDT (Editor and Debugger for the TECO) system, which was developed in the late 1960s for the PDP-1 computer. EDT allowed users to edit and debug programs using a combination of commands and macros, paving the way for modern text editors and interactive development environments.

== Use ==
Notable uses for interpreters include:

Commands and scripts
Interpreters are frequently used to execute commands and scripts

Virtualization
An interpreter acts as a virtual machine to execute machine code for a hardware architecture different from the one running the interpreter.

Emulation
An interpreter (virtual machine) can emulate another computer system in order to run code written for that system.

Sandboxing
While some types of sandboxes rely on operating system protections, an interpreter (virtual machine) can offer additional control such as blocking code that violates security rules.

Self-modifying code
Self-modifying code can be implemented in an interpreted language. This relates to the origins of interpretation in Lisp and artificial intelligence research.

== Efficiency ==
Interpretive overhead is the runtime cost of executing code via an interpreter instead of as native (compiled) code. Interpreting is slower because the interpreter executes multiple machine-code instructions for the equivalent functionality in the native code. In particular, access to variables is slower in an interpreter because the mapping of identifiers to storage locations must be done repeatedly at run-time rather than at compile time. But faster development (due to factors such as shorter edit-build-run cycle) can outweigh the value of faster execution speed—especially when prototyping and testing when the edit-build-run cycle is frequent.

An interpreter may generate an intermediate representation (IR) of the program from source code in order to achieve goals such as fast runtime performance. A compiler may also generate an IR, but the compiler generates machine code for later execution whereas the interpreter prepares to execute the program. These differing goals lead to differing IR design. Many BASIC interpreters replace keywords with single byte tokens which can be used to find the instruction in a jump table. A few interpreters, such as the PBASIC interpreter, achieve even higher levels of program compaction by using a bit-oriented rather than a byte-oriented program memory structure, where commands tokens occupy perhaps 5 bits, nominally "16-bit" constants are stored in a variable-length code requiring 3, 6, 10, or 18 bits, and address operands include a "bit offset". Many BASIC interpreters can store and read back their own tokenized internal representation.

There are various compromises between the development speed when using an interpreter and the execution speed when using a compiler. Some systems (such as some Lisps) allow interpreted and compiled code to call each other and to share variables. This means that once a routine has been tested and debugged under the interpreter it can be compiled and thus benefit from faster execution while other routines are being developed.

== Implementation ==
Since the early stages of interpreting and compiling are similar, an interpreter might use the same lexical analyzer and parser as a compiler and then interpret the resulting abstract syntax tree.

== Example ==
An expression interpreter written in C++.

import std;

using std::runtime_error;
using std::unique_ptr;
using std::variant;

// data types for abstract syntax tree
enum class Kind: char { 
    VAR, 
    CONST, 
    SUM, 
    DIFF, 
    MULT, 
    DIV, 
    PLUS, 
    MINUS, 
    NOT 
};

// forward declaration
class Node;

class Variable { 
public:
    int* memory; 
};

class Constant {
public:
    int value; 
};

class UnaryOperation {
public:
    unique_ptr<Node> right; 
};

class BinaryOperation { 
public:
    unique_ptr<Node> left;
    unique_ptr<Node> right;
};

using Expression = variant<Variable, Constant, BinaryOperation, UnaryOperation>;

class Node {
public:
    Kind kind;
    Expression e;
};

// interpreter procedure
[[nodiscard]]
int executeIntExpression(const Node& n) {
    int leftValue;
    int rightValue;
    switch (n->kind) {
        case Kind::VAR:
            return std::get<Variable>(n.e).memory;
        case Kind::CONST:
            return std::get<Constant>(n.e).value;
        case Kind::SUM:
        case Kind::DIFF:
        case Kind::MULT:
        case Kind::DIV:
            const BinaryOperation& bin = std::get<BinaryOperation>(n.e);
            leftValue = executeIntExpression(bin.left.get());
            rightValue = executeIntExpression(bin.right.get());
            switch (n.kind) {
                case Kind::SUM: 
                    return leftValue + rightValue;
                case Kind::DIFF: 
                    return leftValue - rightValue;
                case Kind::MULT: 
                    return leftValue * rightValue;
                case Kind::DIV: 
                    if (rightValue == 0) {
                        throw runtime_error("Division by zero");
                    }
                    return leftValue / rightValue;
            }
        case Kind::PLUS: 
        case Kind::MINUS: 
        case Kind::NOT:
            const UnaryOperation& un = std::get<UnaryOperation>(n.e);
            rightValue = executeIntExpression(un.right.get());
            switch (n.kind) {
                case Kind::PLUS:
                    return +rightValue;
                case Kind::MINUS:
                    return -rightValue;
                case Kind::NOT: 
                    return !rightValue;
            }
        default: 
            std::unreachable();
    }
}

== Just-in-time compilation ==
Just-in-time (JIT) compilation is the process of converting an intermediate format (i.e. bytecode) to native code at runtime. As this results in native code execution, it is a method of avoiding the runtime cost of using an interpreter while maintaining some of the benefits that led to the development of interpreters.

== Variations ==
Control table interpreter
Logic is specified as data formatted as a table.

Bytecode interpreter
Some interpreters process bytecode which is an intermediate format of logic compiled from a high-level language. For example, Emacs Lisp is compiled to bytecode which is interpreted by an interpreter. One might say that this compiled code is machine code for a virtual machine – implemented by the interpreter. Such an interpreter is sometimes called a compreter.

Threaded code interpreter
A threaded code interpreter is similar to bytecode interpreter but instead of bytes, uses pointers. Each instruction is a word that points to a function or an instruction sequence, possibly followed by a parameter. The threaded code interpreter either loops fetching instructions and calling the functions they point to, or fetches the first instruction and jumps to it, and every instruction sequence ends with a fetch and jump to the next instruction. One example of threaded code is the Forth code used in Open Firmware systems. The source language is compiled into "F code" (a bytecode), which is then interpreted by a virtual machine.

Abstract syntax tree interpreter
An abstract syntax tree interpreter transforms source code into an abstract syntax tree (AST), then interprets it directly, or uses it to generate native code via JIT compilation. In this approach, each sentence needs to be parsed just once. As an advantage over bytecode, AST keeps the global program structure and relations between statements (which is lost in a bytecode representation), and when compressed provides a more compact representation. Thus, using AST has been proposed as a better intermediate format than bytecode. However, for interpreters, AST results in more overhead than a bytecode interpreter, because of nodes related to syntax performing no useful work, of a less sequential representation (requiring traversal of more pointers) and of overhead visiting the tree.

Template interpreter
Rather than implement the execution of code by virtue of a large switch statement containing every possible bytecode, while operating on a software stack or a tree walk, a template interpreter maintains a large array of bytecode (or any efficient intermediate representation) mapped directly to corresponding native machine instructions that can be executed on the host hardware as key value pairs (or in more efficient designs, direct addresses to the native instructions), known as a "Template". When the particular code segment is executed the interpreter simply loads or jumps to the opcode mapping in the template and directly runs it on the hardware. Due to its design, the template interpreter very strongly resembles a JIT compiler rather than a traditional interpreter, however it is technically not a JIT due to the fact that it merely translates code from the language into native calls one opcode at a time rather than creating optimized sequences of CPU executable instructions from the entire code segment. Due to the interpreter's simple design of simply passing calls directly to the hardware rather than implementing them directly, it is much faster than every other type, even bytecode interpreters, and to an extent less prone to bugs, but as a tradeoff is more difficult to maintain due to the interpreter having to support translation to multiple different architectures instead of a platform independent virtual machine/stack. To date, the only template interpreter implementations of widely known languages to exist are the interpreter within Java's official reference implementation, the Sun HotSpot Java Virtual Machine, and the Ignition Interpreter in the Google V8 JavaScript execution engine.

Microcode
Microcode provides an abstraction layer as a hardware interpreter that implements machine code in a lower-level machine code. It separates the high-level machine instructions from the underlying electronics so that the high-level instructions can be designed and altered more freely. It also facilitates providing complex multi-step instructions, while reducing the complexity of computer circuits.

== See also ==
- Dynamic compilation
- Homoiconicity – Characteristic of a programming language
- Meta-circular evaluator – Type of interpreter in computing
- Partial evaluation – Technique for program optimization
- Read–eval–print loop – Computer programming environment

== Sources ==
- Aycock, J. (June 2003). "A brief history of just-in-time". ACM Computing Surveys. 35 (2): 97–113. CiteSeerX 10.1.1.97.3985. doi:10.1145/857076.857077. S2CID 15345671.
