= Portal Software =

American billing software company, 1985–2006

Portal Software, Inc.
- Industry: Internet service provider; Software
- Predecessor: Portal Information Network
- Founded: 1985; 41 years ago
- Founder: John Little
- Defunct: 2006
- Fate: Acquired by Oracle Corporation
- Successor: Oracle Corporation

Portal Software, Inc. was a US enterprise software company that developed billing and revenue management systems for internet and telecommunications service providers. Its primary product, Portal Infranet, was used by telecoms operators and ISPs to handle real-time customer management, rating and billing at scale. The company was acquired by Oracle Corporation in 2006 for approximately $220 million.

== History ==
Portal Software was founded in 1985 as Portal Information Network by John Little, initially operating as one of the first Internet service providers in the San Francisco Bay Area. The company offered internet access via modem, providing email and, by the late 1980s, FTP access through its own interface.

As the company managed its own subscriber base, it built internal account management and billing software to handle customer operations. In 1992, John Little concluded that the software itself was more valuable than the ISP business, and pivoted the company to sell that software to other service providers. The ISP business was shut down and its accounts sold to Sprint.

The company was renamed Portal Software in 1993, and Dave Labuda joined as co-founder. Little and Labuda developed a scalable, real-time enterprise software architecture focused on customer and revenue management for telecoms and internet providers. To extend its capabilities in high-performance telephony rating, Portal acquired the InteGrate software from Solution42, a German company with expertise in telecommunications usage event processing.

Portal Infranet, its flagship product suite, was adopted by major telecoms operators worldwide. Customers included PSINet, AOL Time Warner, China Mobile, Deutsche Telekom, France Télécom, iG Brazil, Juno Online Services, KPN, Orange UK, Reuters, SIRIUS Satellite Radio, Sprint Canada, Telefónica, Telenor, Telstra, TIM, U.S. Cellular, Vodafone, SaskTel and XM Satellite Radio.

In 2006, Oracle Corporation acquired Portal Software for approximately $220 million. At the time of the acquisition, Dave Labuda was CEO, Bhaskar Gorti was Senior Vice President of Worldwide Marketing and Sales, JK Chelladurai was Managing Director of the India development centre, Bruce Grainger was Vice President of Americas and Tim Porter was Vice President of EMEA.
