= InteGrate =

IntegRate was a software product written in C++ based on a pipe-lined high performance architecture for handling batch rating of telecommunications using call detail records (CDR), developed by the German software company Solution 42.

== Description ==
The product was an early massively parallel application. It processed and charge thousands of events per second on commodity hardware. The software was able to run on the following operating systems: Windows, Unix/Linux, Solaris, HP-UX and AIX. It contained algorithms for ultra-fast regular expression matching using a finite-state machine as well as one of the first in-memory databases.

IntegRate platform is a conceptual structure for performing the complex task of telecommunications rating and price modeling. The "framework" contains "pipelines", each of which consists of "plug-ins", which can be freely combined. The standard plug-ins cover rating tasks (e.g. zoning, service determination) and the overall rating process can be customized by using the IntegRate script languages "iScript" and "iRule". This allows configuring plug-in modules to prepare or post-process CDR-information.

Solution42 (a name taken from Douglas Adams's "Hitchhikers Guide to the Galaxy" cult series), originally based in Quickborn, Germany, was purchased by Portal Software in 2000. Since the purchase of Solution42, the IntegRate architecture was integrated into the so-called "Portal Infranet " telecommunications billing platform, now called the Batch Rating Engine (BRE).

In 2006 Oracle Corporation acquired Portal Software. IntegRate became the central rating and mediation engine with Oracle's CBRM System.

In 2003 the core engineers and lead architects of former Solution42 founded ENTEREST to build the successor product "EDR Workbench" marketed for complex event processing using the marketing term big data.
