= Economics of open data =

The economics of open data refers to the production, or loss, of wealth related to the use of open data. The cost of open data is a primary concern that can deter governments and companies from the opening up of data. While open data may theoretically have a low production cost, the cost of creating the original data set as well as maintaining that data once it is produced can be expensive. Though the creation of data may be expensive governments around the world such as France, the United States, and Japan, are anticipating substantial economic growth.

== Open Data vs. Paid Data ==
Open data has the capability to increase economic benefit through both individuals' and companies' use of the information. As of March 2016, it was estimated that open data was generating 0.5% more GDP compared to paid data. The creation of open data relies on either funding from government to create and maintain the data or funding in the form of grants and volunteers. Data made open by governments largely relies on the publication of public service research. Because the data has already been created for a purpose, there is no creation cost for it to be made available to the public.

The opening of data requires current and advance technologies as well as the employment of users who are skilled enough to complete such work. When data is collected it cannot be presented to the public in its raw form and may be inaccessible due to the program it uses or how the data is presented may be unusable. Time and funding is required to be reallocated by those who create the original dataset in order to make the data more accessible and usable for citizens to understand and engage with. When government is the main source of funding for the production of data it does not necessarily mean that they are the singular entity creating or managing the data. Governments sometimes contract out the creation or management of data to a third party. In some cases the third party may provide access to the data in exchange for a nominal fee. Citizen led initiatives face similar issues, such as the requirement of time and funding. For these types of initiatives it can be especially difficult because they do not have access to a guaranteed steady income such as taxpayer money; these organizations largely depend on donations.

Paying for the use of public data would cover some of the costs associated with creating, maintaining and formatting data, although it would reduced the economic value of what once was opened by 50%. Paying for the data that is now available for free would result in a lack of innovation, decreasing the GDP, as well as an increase in the cost of services created from use of purchased data. The opening of data reduces costs associated with licensing that is usually associated with paid data, as it costs more money to license a dataset than to have no license at all, though there are open datasets that use licensing as well. The opening of data itself does not simply create economic prosperity; systematic reforms would take place in order for open data innovations to find a place.

== Open Data and Economic Opportunity ==
Open data gains additional economic value when governments support open data initiatives, although increased uptake and citizen engagement is vital to the economic success of open data. Greater economic impact depends on revenue growth, cost reduction, and job creation. Revenue can be increased through the use of open data with the creation of new businesses, new good or services, or improved goods and services. When businesses profit from the creation of goods or services that rely upon open data not only does their company reap the financial benefits but the government does as well, through the increase of tax revenue. Cost reduction helps to increase revenue for private sector businesses but is also an asset to government. Cost reduction in government, whether through reduction of services required or labor requirements, reduces government spending in some areas allowing for investment in others. Open data can also increase economic benefit through the creation of jobs. Jobs can be created through innovative entrepreneurship or through the requirement of skilled labourers to use and understand data.

== Examples of Open Data Financial Models ==
There are numerous ways in which businesses currently support the generation, creation and upkeep of their data. In most cases businesses, or data brokers, will sell this information to third parties for a profit. As charging a fee for data would defeat the purpose of open data, governments and businesses must rely on different financial models. Normally a government or business would finance a public sector body to generate the data and profit or cost recovery would be achieved through users paying a licensing fee back to the public sector body. In turn, the profit made by the users could then be taxed and return finances to the government.

=== Budget Financing Model ===
Budget financing a specific amount of funds is allocated toward the open data project from general revenue. In this case the funding invested in to the project is only expected to cover the minimal costs. Businesses and Governments often expect to see a return from the opening up of data such as increased efficiency within their work environment or more positive citizen perceptions of the company or government.

=== Community Model ===
This model relies on individual citizens to invest their time and skills into generating and maintaining open data. A very successful example of this would be OpenStreetMap, which is continually updated and expanded by everyday users. The community model can also easily incorporate interactive benefits such as user feedback and the improvement of data quality. In this case there is a lot of room for innovation and conversation though the strong dependence on citizen engagement means individuals must actively be engaged with the data on a regular basis or risk the decrease in data quantity and quality.

=== Advertising Model ===
The advertising model is a popular method that can be seen across many online publications. In order to cover operating costs an open data publisher relies on revenue from advertisers. In these cases citizens are exposed to add banners and pop ups displayed on the same site as the data they are attempting to access. While this may prove sustainable for individual company websites some governments have policies against displaying advertisements on government webpages, which could prevent them from adapting such a model.
