= Base One Foundation Component Library =

Application development toolkit

Base One Foundation Component Library (BFC)
- Original authors: Steven Asherman, Arun Kumar
- Developer: Content Galaxy Inc.
- Stable release: 7.61 / November 11, 2020; 5 years ago
- Written in: C++, C#
- Operating system: Microsoft Windows
- Platform: Microsoft Visual Studio, .NET
- Type: Web application framework
- License: GPLv3
- Website: contentgalaxy.com/software/bfc

The Base One Foundation Component Library (BFC) is a rapid application development toolkit for building secure, fault-tolerant, database applications on Windows and ASP.NET. In conjunction with Microsoft's Visual Studio integrated development environment, BFC provides a general-purpose web application framework for working with databases from Microsoft, Oracle, IBM, Sybase, and MySQL, running under Windows, Linux/Unix, or IBM iSeries or z/OS. BFC includes facilities for distributed computing, batch processing, queuing, and database command scripting, and these run under Windows or Linux with Wine.

== Design ==
BFC is based on a database-centric architecture whose cross-DBMS data dictionary plays a central role in supporting data security, validation, optimization, and maintainability features. Some of BFC’s core technologies are based on underlying U.S. patents in database communication and high precision arithmetic.

BFC supports a unique model of large scale, distributed computing. This is intended to reduce the vulnerability and performance impact of either depending on a centralized process to distribute tasks or communicating directly between nodes through messages. Deutsche Bank made use of the initial version of BFC to build its securities' custody system and is one of the earliest successful examples of commercial grid computing.

BFC implements a grid computing architecture that revolves around the model of a "virtual supercomputer" composed of loosely coupled "batch job servers". These perform tasks that are specified and coordinated through database-resident control structures and queues. The model is virtual, as it uses the available processing power and resources of ordinary servers and database systems, which can also continue to work in their previous roles. The result is termed a virtual supercomputer because it presents itself as a single, unified computational resource that can be scaled both in capacity and processing power.

== History ==
BFC was originally developed by Base One International Corp., funded by projects done for Marsh & McLennan and Deutsche Bank that started in the mid-1990s. Beginning in 1994, Johnson & Higgins (later acquired by Marsh & McLennan), built Stars, an insurance risk management system, using components known as ADF (Application Development Framework). ADF was the predecessor of BFC and was jointly developed by Johnson & Higgins and Base One programmers, with Base One retaining ownership of ADF, and Johnson & Higgins retaining all rights to Stars risk management software. In 2014, BFC was acquired by Content Galaxy Inc., whose video publishing service was built with BFC.

The name "BFC" was a play on MFC Microsoft Foundation Classes, which BFC extended through Visual C++ class libraries to facilitate the development of large-scale, client/server database applications. Developers can incorporate BFC components into web and Windows applications written in any of the major Microsoft programming languages (C#, ASP.NET, Visual C++, VB.NET). They can also use a variety of older technologies, including COM/ActiveX, MFC, and Crystal Reports. BFC works with both managed and unmanaged code, and it can be used to construct either thin client or rich client applications, with or without browser-based interfaces.
