= Conditional (computer programming) =

Control flow statement that branches according to a Boolean expression

If-then-else flow diagram

A nested if–then–else flow diagram

In computer programming, a conditional statement directs program control flow based on the value of a condition; a Boolean expression. A conditional expression evaluates to a value without the side-effect of changing control flow.

Many programming languages (such as C) have distinct conditional statements and expressions. In pure functional programming, a conditional expression does not have side-effects, many functional programming languages with conditional expressions (such as Lisp) support side-effects.

== Conditional statement ==
=== If-then-else statement ===
Although the syntax of an if-then-else statement varies by language, the general syntax is shown as pseudocode below. The part represented by the condition placeholder is an expression that evaluates to either true or false. If true, control passes to consequent and when complete to after end if. If false, control passes to alternative and when complete to after end if. As the else clause is optional, the else alternative part can be omitted. Typically, both consequent and alternative can be either a single statement or a block of statements.

if condition then
    consequent
else
    alternative
end if

The following example, also in pseudocode, replaces placeholders with example logic.

if stock = 0 then
    message = 'order new stock'
else
    message = 'there is stock'
end if

==== History and development ====
In early programming languages, especially dialects of BASIC, an if–then-else statement could only contain goto statements but this tended to result in hard-to-read spaghetti code. As a result, structured programming, which supports control flow via code blocks, gained in popularity, until it became the norm in most BASIC variants and all languages. Such mechanisms and principles were based on the ALGOL family of languages, including Pascal and Modula-2. While it is possible to use goto in a structured way, structured programming makes this easier. A structured if–then–else statement is one of the key elements of structured programming, and it is present in most popular languages such as C, Java, JavaScript and Visual Basic.

==== Dangling else ====
The convention is that an else clause, like the then clause, responds to the nearest preceding if clause. However, the semantics of nested conditionals in some early languages such as ALGOL 60 were less than clear; the syntax was inadequate to always specify the same predicate if clause. Thus, the parser might randomly pair the else with any one of the perhaps manifold if clauses in the intended nested hierarchy.

For example, take the statement:

if A then if B then S else S2

or the same statement but indented for clarity:

if A then
  if B then
      S
  else 
      S2

may be parsed either as meaning:

if A then (if B then S) else S2 end

if A then
    (if B then S)
else 
    S2
end

or as meaning:

if A then (if B then S else S2)

if A then
    (if B then S else S2)
end

This is known as the dangling else problem. It is resolved in various ways, depending on the language (in some, by means of explicit block-ending syntax (such as end if ) or a block enclosure, such as curly brackets ( {⋯} ).

==== Chaining ====
Chaining conditionals is often provided in a language via an else-if construct. Only the statements following the first condition that is true are executed. Other statements are skipped. In placeholder pseudocode:

if condition1 then 
  block1
else if condition2 then 
  block2
else if condition3 then 
  block3
  ...
else
  block4
end if

In the following pseudocode, a shop offers as much as a 30% discount for an item. If the discount is 10%, then the first if statement is true and "you have to pay $30" is printed. All other statements below that first if statement are skipped.

if discount < 11% then 
  print "You have to pay $30."
else if discount < 21% then 
  print "You have to pay $20."
else if discount < 31% then 
  print "You have to pay $10."
end if

Only one end if is needed if one uses else if instead of else followed by if.

In ALGOL 68, the 1968 “Draft Report” (circulated as a supplement to ALGOL Bulletin no. 26) still used the bold keyword elsf in “contracted” conditionals. The spelling elif was then standardized in the “Revised Report on the Algorithmic Language ALGOL 68” (1973), which lists both the bold words if ~ then ~ elif ~ else ~ fi and their “brief” symbols, where elif corresponds to |: in the compact form ( ~ | ~ |: ~ | ~ | ~ ).

In Ada, the elseif keyword is syntactic sugar for the two words else if. PHP also supports an elseif keyword both for its curly brackets or colon syntaxes. Perl and Ruby provide the keyword elsif to avoid the large number of braces that would be required by multiple if and else statements. Python uses the special keyword elif because structure is denoted by indentation rather than braces, so a repeated use of else and if would require increased indentation after every condition. Visual Basic, supports ElseIf. Similarly, the earlier UNIX shells (later gathered up to the POSIX shell syntax) use elif too, but giving the choice of delimiting with spaces, line breaks, or both.

However, in many languages more directly descended from Algol, such as Simula, Pascal, BCPL and C, this special syntax for the else if construct is not present, nor is it present in the many syntactical derivatives of C, such as Java, ECMAScript, and so on. This works because in these languages, any single statement (in this case if cond...) can follow a conditional without being enclosed in a block.

If all terms in the sequence of conditionals are testing the value of a single expression (e.g., if x = 0, else if x = 1, else if x = 2 ...), an alternative is the switch statement. In a language that does not have a switch statement, these can be encoded as a chained if-then-else.

=== Switch statement ===
A switch statement supports multiway branching, often comparing the value of an expression with constant values and transferring control to the code of the first match. There is usually a provision for a default action if no match is found. An optimizing compiler may use a control table to implement the logic of a switch statement. In a dynamic language, the cases may not be limited to constant expressions, and might extend to pattern matching, as in the shell script example on the right, where the '*)' implements the default case as a regular expression matching any string.

=== Guarded conditional ===
The Guarded Command Language (GCL) of Edsger Dijkstra supports conditional execution as a list of commands consisting of a Boolean-valued guard (corresponding to a condition) and its corresponding statement. In GCL, exactly one of the statements whose guards is true is evaluated, but which one is arbitrary. In this code

if G0 → S0
 □ G1 → S1
...
 □ Gn → Sn
fi

the G_{i}'s are the guards and the S_{i}'s are the statements. If none of the guards is true, the program's behavior is undefined.

GCL is intended primarily for reasoning about programs, but similar notations have been implemented in Concurrent Pascal and occam.

=== Arithmetic if ===
The earliest conditional statement in Fortran, up to Fortran 77, was the arithmetic if statement which jumped to one of three labels depending on whether a value (of type integer, real, or double precision) is <0, 0, or >0.

In the following code, control passes to one of the labels based on the value of e.

      IF (e) label1, label2, label3

This is equivalent to the following sequence.

      e_temp = e
      IF (e_temp .LT. 0) GOTO label1
      IF (e_temp .EQ. 0) GOTO label2
      GOTO label3

As it acts like goto, arithmetic if is unstructured, not structured, programming. It was the only conditional statement in the original implementation of Fortran on the IBM 704 computer. On that computer, the test-and-branch op-code had three addresses for those three states. Other computers would have "flag" registers such as positive, zero, negative, even, overflow, carry, associated with the last arithmetic operations and would use instructions such as 'Branch if accumulator negative' then 'Branch if accumulator zero' or similar. Note that the expression is evaluated once only, and in cases such as integer arithmetic where overflow may occur, the overflow or carry flags would be considered also.

The Arithmetic IF statement was listed as obsolescent starting with the Fortran 90 Standard. It was deleted from the Fortran 2018 Standard. Nonetheless, most compilers continue to support it for compatibility with legacy codes.

=== In Smalltalk ===
In contrast to other languages, in Smalltalk the conditional statement is not a language construct but defined in the class Boolean as an abstract method that takes two parameters, both closures. Boolean has two subclasses, True and False, which both define the method, True executing the first closure only, False executing the second closure only.

var = condition 
    ifTrue: [ 'foo' ]
    ifFalse: [ 'bar' ]

=== In JavaScript ===
JavaScript supports if-else statements similar to C syntax. The following example has conditional Math.random() < 0.5 which is true if the random float (value between 0 and 1) is greater than 0.5. The statement uses it to randomly choose between outputting You got Heads! or You got Tails!.

if (Math.random() < 0.5) {
  console.log("You got Heads!");
} else {
  console.log("You got Tails!");
}

Conditionals can be chained as shown below:

var x = Math.random();
if (x < 1/3) {
  console.log("One person won!");
} else if (x < 2/3) {
  console.log("Two people won!");
} else {
  console.log("It's a three-way tie!");
}

=== Lambda calculus ===
In Lambda calculus, the concept of an if-then-else conditional can be expressed using the following expressions:

true = λx. λy. x
false = λx. λy. y
ifThenElse = (λc. λx. λy. (c x y))

1. true takes up to two arguments and once both are provided (see currying), it returns the first argument given.
2. false takes up to two arguments and once both are provided(see currying), it returns the second argument given.
3. ifThenElse takes up to three arguments and once all are provided, it passes both second and third argument to the first argument(which is a function that given two arguments, and produces a result). We expect ifThenElse to only take true or false as an argument, both of which project the given two arguments to their preferred single argument, which is then returned.

Note: if ifThenElse is passed two functions as the left and right conditionals; it is necessary to also pass an empty tuple () to the result of ifThenElse in order to actually call the chosen function, otherwise ifThenElse will just return the function object without getting called.

In a system where numbers can be used without definition (like Lisp, Traditional paper math, so on), the above can be expressed as a single closure below:

((λtrue. λfalse. λifThenElse.
    (ifThenElse true 2 3)
)(λx. λy. x)(λx. λy. y)(λc. λl. λr. c l r))

Here, true, false, and ifThenElse are bound to their respective definitions which are passed to their scope at the end of their block.

A working JavaScript analogy(using only functions of single variable for rigor) to this is as follows:

var computationResult = ((_true => _false => _ifThenElse => 
    _ifThenElse(_true)(2)(3) 
)(x => y => x)(x => y => y)(c => x => y => c(x)(y)));

The code above with multivariable functions looks like this:

var computationResult = ((_true, _false, _ifThenElse) =>
    _ifThenElse(_true, 2, 3)
)((x, y) => x, (x, y) => y, (c, x, y) => c(x, y));

Another version of the earlier example without a system where numbers are assumed is below.

The first example shows the first branch being taken, while second example shows the second branch being taken.

((λtrue. λfalse. λifThenElse.
    (ifThenElse true (λFirstBranch. FirstBranch) (λSecondBranch. SecondBranch))
)(λx. λy. x)(λx. λy. y)(λc. λl. λr. c l r))

((λtrue. λfalse. λifThenElse.
    (ifThenElse false (λFirstBranch. FirstBranch) (λSecondBranch. SecondBranch))
)(λx. λy. x)(λx. λy. y)(λc. λl. λr. c l r))

Smalltalk uses a similar idea for its true and false representations, with True and False being singleton objects that respond to messages ifTrue/ifFalse differently.

Haskell used to use this exact model for its Boolean type, but at the time of writing, most Haskell programs use syntactic sugar if a then b else c construct which unlike ifThenElse does not compose unless either wrapped in another function or re-implemented as shown in The Haskell section of this page.

== Conditional expression ==
Many languages support a conditional expression, which unlike a statement evaluates to a value instead of controlling control flow. The concept of conditional expression was first developed by John McCarthy during his research into symbolic processing and LISP in the late 1950s.

=== Examples ===
==== Algol ====
ALGOL 60 and some other members of the ALGOL family allow if–then–else as an expression. The idea of including conditional expressions was suggested by John McCarthy, though the ALGOL committee decided to use English words rather than McCarthy's mathematical syntax:

myvariable := if x > 20 then 1 else 2

==== ALGOL 68 ====
Compound statements are all terminated (guarded) by distinctive closing brackets:

- IF choice clauses:

 IF condition THEN statements [ ELSE statements ] FI
 "brief" form:  ( condition | statements | statements )

 IF condition1 THEN statements ELIF condition2 THEN statements [ ELSE statements ] FI
 "brief" form:  ( condition1 | statements |: condition2 | statements | statements )

This scheme not only avoids the dangling else problem but also avoids having to use BEGIN and END in embedded statement sequences.

- CASE choice clauses:

 CASE switch IN statements, statements,... [ OUT statements ] ESAC
 "brief" form:  ( switch | statements,statements,... | statements )

 CASE switch1 IN statements, statements,... OUSE switch2 IN statements, statements,... [ OUT statements ] ESAC
 "brief" form of CASE statement:  ( switch1 | statements,statements,... |: switch2 | statements,statements,... | statements )

Choice clause example with Brief symbols:

PROC days in month = (INT year, month)INT:
  (month|
    31,
    (year÷×4=0 ∧ year÷×100≠0  ∨  year÷×400=0 | 29 | 28 ),
    31, 30, 31, 30, 31, 31, 30, 31, 30, 31
  );

==== Lisp ====
Conditional expressions have always been a fundamental part of Lisp . In pure LISP, the COND function is used. In dialects such as Scheme, Racket and Common Lisp :

;; Scheme
(define (myvariable x) (if (> x 12) 1 2))   ; Assigns 'myvariable' to 1 or 2, depending on the value of 'x'

;; Common Lisp
(let ((x 10))
  (setq myvariable (if (> x 12) 2 4)))  ; Assigns 'myvariable' to 2

==== Haskell ====
In Haskell 98, there is only an if expression, no if statement, and the else part is compulsory, as every expression must have some value. Logic that would be expressed with conditionals in other languages is usually expressed with pattern matching in recursive functions.

Because Haskell is lazy, it is possible to write control structures, such as if, as ordinary expressions; the lazy evaluation means that an if function can evaluate only the condition and proper branch (where a strict language would evaluate all three). It can be written like this:

if' :: Bool -> a -> a -> a
if' True x _ = x
if' False _ y = y

==== C-like languages ====
C and related languages support a ternary operator that provides for conditional expressions like:

condition ? true-value : false-value

If condition is true, then the expression evaluates to true-value; otherwise to false-value. In the following code, r is assigned to "foo" if x > 10, and to "bar" if not.

r = x > 10 ? "foo" : "bar";

To accomplish the same using an if-statement, this would take more than one statement, and require mentioning r twice:

if (x > 10)
    r = "foo";
else
    r = "bar";

Some argue that the explicit if-then statement is easier to read and that it may compile to more efficient code than the ternary operator, while others argue that concise expressions are easier to read and better since they have less repeated clauses.

==== Visual Basic ====
In Visual Basic and some other languages, a function called IIf is provided, which can be used as a conditional expression. However, it does not behave like a true conditional expression, because both the true and false branches are always evaluated; it is just that the result of one of them is thrown away, while the result of the other is returned by the IIf function.

==== Tcl ====
In Tcl if is not a keyword but a function (in Tcl known as command or proc). For example

if {$x > 10} {
    puts "Foo!"
}

invokes a function named if passing 2 arguments: The first one being the condition and the second one being the true branch. Both arguments are passed as strings (in Tcl everything within curly brackets is a string).

In the above example the condition is not evaluated before calling the function. Instead, the implementation of the if function receives the condition as a string value and is responsible to evaluate this string as an expression in the callers scope.

Such a behavior is possible by using uplevel and expr commands. Uplevel makes it possible to implement new control constructs as Tcl procedures (for example, uplevel could be used to implement the while construct as a Tcl procedure).

Because if is actually a function it also returns a value. The return value from the command is the result of the body script that was executed, or an empty string if none of the expressions was non-zero and there was no bodyN.

==== Rust ====
In Rust, if is always an expression. It evaluates to the value of whichever branch is executed, or to the unit type () if no branch is executed. If a branch does not provide a return value, it evaluates to () by default. To ensure the if expression's type is known at compile time, each branch must evaluate to a value of the same type. For this reason, an else branch is effectively compulsory unless the other branches evaluate to (), because an if without an else can always evaluate to () by default.

The following assigns r to 1 or 2 depending on the value of x.

let r = if x > 20 {
    1
} else {
    2
};

Values can be omitted when not needed.

if x > 20 {
    println!("x is greater than 20");
}

== Pattern matching ==
Pattern matching is an alternative to conditional statements (such as if–then–else and switch). It is available in many languages with functional programming features, such as Wolfram Language, ML and many others. Here is a simple example written in the OCaml language:

match fruit with
| "apple" -> cook pie
| "coconut" -> cook dango_mochi
| "banana" -> mix;;

The power of pattern matching is the ability to concisely match not only actions but also values to patterns of data. Here is an example written in Haskell which illustrates both of these features:

map _ []      = []
map f (h : t) = f h : map f t

This code defines a function map, which applies the first argument (a function) to each of the elements of the second argument (a list), and returns the resulting list. The two lines are the two definitions of the function for the two kinds of arguments possible in this case – one where the list is empty (just return an empty list) and the other case where the list is not empty.

Pattern matching is not strictly speaking always a choice construct, because it is possible in Haskell to write only one alternative, which is guaranteed to always be matched – in this situation, it is not being used as a choice construct, but simply as a way to bind names to values. However, it is frequently used as a choice construct in the languages in which it is available.

== Map-based conditionals ==
In programming languages that have associative arrays or comparable data structures, such as Python, Perl, PHP or Objective-C, it is idiomatic to use them to implement conditional assignment.

pet = input("Enter the type of pet you want to name: ")
known_pets = {
    "Dog": "Fido",
    "Cat": "Meowsles",
    "Bird": "Tweety",
}
my_name = known_pets[pet]

In languages that have anonymous functions or that allow a programmer to assign a named function to a variable reference, conditional flow can be implemented by using a dictionary as a dispatch table.

== Branch predication ==
An alternative to conditional branch instructions is branch predication. Predication is an architectural feature that enables instructions to be conditionally executed instead of modifying the control flow.

== Choice system cross reference ==
This table refers to the most recent language specification of each language. For languages that do not have a specification, the latest officially released implementation is referred to.

Programming language	Structured if			switch–select–case	Conditional expressions	Arithmetic if	Pattern matching^{[A]}
Programming language	then	else	else–if	switch–select–case	Conditional expressions	Arithmetic if	Pattern matching^{[A]}
Ada	Yes	Yes	Yes	Yes	Yes	No	No
ALGOL-60	Yes	Yes	Unneeded^{[C]}	No	Yes	No	No
ALGOL 68	Yes	Yes	Yes	Yes	Yes	Yes - case clause	Yes - Conformity clause
APL	No	Yes	Yes	Yes	Yes	No	No
Bash shell	Yes	Yes	Yes	Yes	Yes	No	Yes
C, C++	No	Yes	Unneeded^{[B]}^{[C]}	Fall-through	Yes	No	No
C#	No	Yes	Unneeded^{[B]}^{[C]}	Yes	Yes	No	No
COBOL	Unneeded	Yes	Unneeded^{[C]}	Yes	No	No	No
Eiffel	Yes	Yes	Yes	Yes	Yes	No	No
F#	Yes	Yes	Yes	Yes^{[D]}	Yes	No	Yes
Fortran	Yes	Yes	Yes	Yes	Yes^{[G]}	Yes^{[I]}	Yes - select type
Go	No	Yes	Unneeded^{[C]}	Yes	No	No	No
Haskell	Yes	Needed	Unneeded^{[C]}	Yes^{[D]}	Yes	No	Yes
Java	No	Yes	Unneeded^{[C]}	Fall-through	Yes	No	No
ECMAScript (JavaScript)	No	Yes	Unneeded^{[C]}	Fall-through	Yes	No	No
Mathematica	No	Yes	Yes	Yes	Yes	No	Yes
Oberon	Yes	Yes	Yes	Yes	No	No	No
Perl	No	Yes	Yes	Yes	Yes	No	No
PHP	No	Yes	Yes	Fall-through	Yes	No	Yes
Pascal, Object Pascal (Delphi)	Yes	Yes	Unneeded	Yes	No	No	No
Python	No	Yes	Yes	Yes	Yes	No	Yes
QuickBASIC	Yes	Yes	Yes	Yes	No	No	No
Ruby	Yes	Yes	Yes	Yes	Yes	No	Yes^{[H]}
Rust	No	Yes	Yes	Yes^{[D]}	Yes	No	Yes
Scala	No	Yes	Unneeded^{[C]}	Fall-through	Yes	No	Yes
SQL	Yes^{[F]}	Yes	Yes	Yes^{[F]}	Yes	No	No
Swift	No	Yes	Yes	Yes	Yes	No	Yes
Tcl	No	Yes	Yes	Yes	Yes	No	Yes
Visual Basic, classic	Yes	Yes	Yes	Yes	Yes	No	No
Visual Basic .NET	Yes	Yes	Yes	Yes	Yes	No	No
Windows PowerShell	No	Yes	Yes	Fall-through	Yes	No	No

1. This refers to pattern matching as a distinct conditional construct in the programming language – as opposed to mere string pattern matching support, such as regular expression support.
2. ^{1} ^{2} An #ELIF directive is used in the preprocessor sub-language that is used to modify the code before compilation; and to include other files.
3. ^{1} ^{2} ^{3} ^{4} ^{5} ^{6} The often-encountered else if in the C family of languages, and in COBOL and Haskell, is not a language feature but a set of nested and independent if then else statements combined with a particular source code layout. However, this also means that a distinct else–if construct is not really needed in these languages.
4. ^{1} ^{2} ^{3} Case-expressions in Haskell and match-expressions in F# and Haskell allow both switch-case and pattern matching usage.
5. In a Ruby case construct, regular expression matching is among the conditional flow-control alternatives available. For an example, see this Stack Overflow question.
6. ^{1} ^{2} SQL has two similar constructs that fulfill both roles, both introduced in SQL-92. A "searched CASE" expression CASE WHEN cond1 THEN expr1 WHEN cond2 THEN expr2 [...] ELSE exprDflt END works like if ... else if ... else, whereas a "simple CASE" expression: CASE expr WHEN val1 THEN expr1 [...] ELSE exprDflt END works like a switch statement. For details and examples see Case (SQL).
7. Fortran 90 added the MERGE intrinsic. Fortran 2023 added the C-like ternary operator.
8. Pattern matching was added in Ruby 3.0. Some pattern matching constructs are still experimental.
9. Arithmetic if was marked as obsolescent in Fortran 90. It was deleted as of the Fortran 2018 Standard.

== See also ==
- Branch (computer science)
- Conditional compilation
- Conditional loop
- Conditional move
- Dynamic dispatch for another way to make execution choices
- McCarthy Formalism for history and historical references
- Named condition
- Relational operator
- Test (Unix)
- Yoda conditions
