= Boolean flag =

A Boolean flag, truth bit or truth flag in computer science is a Boolean value represented as one or more bits, which encodes a state variable with two possible values.

== Memory usage ==
A single byte can contain up to 8 separate Boolean flags by mapping one Boolean flag to each bit, making it a very economical and dense method of data storage. This is known as a packed representation or bit-packing, and the opposite encoding with only one Boolean flag per byte used is known as a sparse representation. For byte-addressable memory the packed representation requires a bit mask and bit-shift to access individual flags in each byte, which can require additional instructions, whereas the sparse representation requires no bit masking. Packed representations are more commonly found in hardware and processor registers as bit fields whereas sparse representations are more commonly found in software as variables of one or more bytes in width, although packed representations can also be supported.

== Efficiency ==
Most computer languages support the setting and testing of single or multiple bits in combination for use as truth indicators and usually up to 256 different combinations of conditions can be tested for with just a single instruction on one byte using bitwise operations. Advancements in processor design and parallel computing mean even more Boolean algebra operations on Boolean flags can be done with just a single instruction using SIMD technology, often implemented in programming languages as compiler intrinsic functions.

== Usage ==
Sometimes, programs are written to simply set flags when certain conditions are detected, rather than have multiple nested conditional statements (e.g. ifs) that can get quite complex. When all the conditions are tested for and all flags set on or off appropriately, testing can commence on various combinations of conditions - by reference to the flags instead of the variables themselves. This can simplify processing considerably and allows decision tables to be implemented by mapping to their binary representations in memory.

== See also ==
- Boolean function
