= Base One International =

Base One International Corporation
- Type: Private
- Industry: Computer software
- Founded: 1993
- Defunct: 2014
- Headquarters: New York City
- Products: BFC, Base One Number Class
- Services: Base One Consulting
- Website: www.boic.com

Base One International Corp. was an American company that specialized in developing software for constructing database applications and distributed computing systems. Headquartered in New York City, the company was founded in 1993 and expanded in 1997 through the founding of its subsidiary, Base One Software Pvt. Ltd., in Bangalore, India. Base One held a number of U.S. patents related to its technologies for distributed computing and high-precision arithmetic.

The company is most known for its Base One Foundation Component Library (BFC) product, which was a rapid application development (RAD) toolkit aimed at users of Microsoft Visual Studio in conjunction with any of the major commercial DBMS products from Microsoft, Oracle, IBM Db2, Sybase, or MySQL.

In 2014, Base One International sold its intellectual property to Content Galaxy Inc. and closed operations.
