= Pseudoconversational transaction =

In transaction processing, a pseudoconversational transaction is a type of transaction that emulates a true conversation in an interactive session. To the end user, it appears as though the program has simply "paused" to request further input, whereas in reality, most resources are released while the input is waiting to be received.

== Transparent termination and restart ==
The controlling program has deliberately saved most of its state during the delay, terminated, and then, on being restarted through new input, restores its previous state. A single control variable is usually retained to hold the current state in terms of the stage of input reached (and therefore what must be recovered at any stage in order to resume processing). The state, including the control variable, is usually preserved in a 'temporary storage record' that maps the variables needing restoration as an aggregate set, usually contained in a single structure (other variables will be re-initialized on restart).

== Conserving resources ==
This method of programming frees up pooled resources (such as memory) for an indeterminate time. This delay is the end-user 'thinking time' (or response time) and depends on human factors including speed of typing. For systems supporting many thousands of users on a single processor, it allows the transparent 'look and feel' of a true conversational session without tying up limited resources.
