= Raw data =

Collection of information that has not been fully processed or analyzed

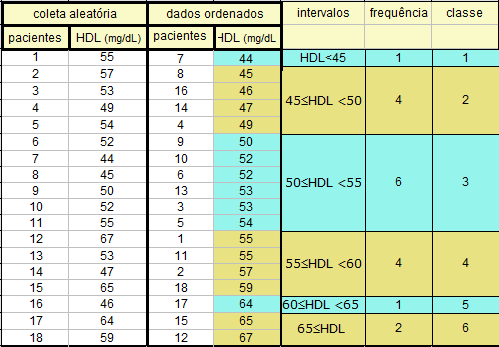
The two columns to the right of the left-most column in this computerized table are raw data.

Raw data, also known as primary data, are data (e.g., numbers, instrument readings, figures, etc.) collected from a source. In the context of examinations, the raw data might be described as a raw score (after test scores).

If a scientist sets up a computerized thermometer which records the temperature of a chemical mixture in a test tube every minute, the list of temperature readings for every minute, as printed out on a spreadsheet or viewed on a computer screen are "raw data". Raw data have not been subjected to processing, "cleaning" by researchers to remove outliers, obvious instrument reading errors or data entry errors, or any analysis (e.g., determining central tendency aspects such as the average or median result). As well, raw data have not been subject to any other manipulation by a software program or a human researcher, analyst or technician. They are also referred to as primary data. Raw data is a relative term (see data), because even once raw data have been "cleaned" and processed by one team of researchers, another team may consider these processed data to be "raw data" for another stage of research. Raw data can be inputted to a computer program or used in manual procedures such as analyzing statistics from a survey. The term "raw data" can refer to the binary data on electronic storage devices, such as hard disk drives (also referred to as "low-level data").

== Generating data ==
Data has two ways of being created or made. The first is what is called 'captured data', and is found through purposeful investigation or analysis. The second is called 'exhaust data', and is gathered usually by machines or terminals as a secondary function. For example, cash registers, smartphones, and speedometers serve a main function but may collect data as a secondary task. Exhaust data is usually too large or of little use to process and becomes 'transient' or thrown away.

== Examples ==
In computing, raw data may have the following attributes: it may possibly contain human, machine, or instrument errors, it may not be validated; it might be in different area (colloquial) formats; uncoded or unformatted; or some entries might be "suspect" (e.g., outliers), requiring confirmation or citation. For example, a data input sheet might contain dates as raw data in many forms: "31st January 1999", "31/01/1999", "31/1/99", "31 Jan", or "today". Once captured, this raw data may be processed stored as a normalized format, perhaps a Julian date, to make it easier for computers and humans to interpret during later processing. Raw data (sometimes colloquially called "sources" data or "eggy" data, the latter a reference to the data being "uncooked", that is, "unprocessed", like a raw egg) are the data input to processing. A distinction is made between data and information, to the effect that information is the end product of data processing. Raw data that has undergone processing are sometimes referred to as "cooked" data in a colloquial sense. Although raw data has the potential to be transformed into "information," extraction, organization, analysis, and formatting for presentation are required before raw data can be transformed into usable information.

For example, a point-of-sale terminal (POS terminal, a computerized cash register) in a busy supermarket collects huge volumes of raw data each day about customers' purchases. However, this list of grocery items and their prices and the time and date of purchase does not yield much information until it is processed. Once processed and analyzed by a software program or even by a researcher using a pen and paper and a calculator, this raw data may indicate the particular items that each customer buys, when they buy them, and at what price; as well, an analyst or manager could calculate the average total sales per customer or the average expenditure per day of the week by hour. This processed and analyzed data provides information for the manager, that the manager could then use to help her determine, for example, how many cashiers to hire and at what times. Such information could then become data for further processing, for example as part of a predictive marketing campaign. As a result of processing, raw data sometimes ends up being put in a database, which enables the raw data to become accessible for further processing and analysis in any number of different ways.

Tim Berners-Lee (inventor of the World Wide Web) argues that sharing raw data is important for society. Inspired by a post by Rufus Pollock of the Open Knowledge Foundation his call to action is "Raw Data Now", meaning that everyone should demand that governments and businesses share the data they collect as raw data. He points out that "data drives a huge amount of what happens in our lives… because somebody takes the data and does something with it." To Berners-Lee, it is essentially from this sharing of raw data, that advances in science will emerge. Advocates of open data argue that once citizens and civil society organizations have access to data from businesses and governments, it will enable citizens and NGOs to do their own analysis of the data, which can empower people and civil society. For example, a government may claim that its policies are reducing the unemployment rate, but a poverty advocacy group may be able to have its staff econometricians do their own analysis of the raw data, which may lead this group to draw different conclusions about the data set.

== Critiques of raw data ==
Critical data studies scholars have critiqued the term raw data. The critique stems from the idea that data can never be raw, instead data are always constructed and shaped by the decisions of people. Humanities scholar Johanna Drucker has argued that data are "capta, taken and constructed". As an example, when data from a thermometer or other instrument is generated, the data is shaped by the configurations specific to the design of the instrument.

== Distinction between raw and processed data ==
Raw data, often called primary data, is the unprocessed and original form of data collected directly from sources or instruments. It may contain errors, inconsistencies, or redundant information and typically requires processing steps such as cleaning, validation, and structuring to become usable. Processed data results from transforming raw data into an organized and interpretable format, making it suitable for analysis, visualization, and decision-making. The flexibility and completeness of raw data enable comprehensive and diverse analyses, while processed data serves as the practical basis for generating actionable insights. Because raw data preserves the fullest detail, it is invaluable in scientific research and machine learning, where high-quality inputs are critical for accuracy of conclusions and model training.

== See also ==
- Standard score
