= Question mark (disambiguation) =

A question mark ? is a type of punctuation mark.

Question mark or ? may also refer to:

== Film and television ==
- ? (2011 film), a 2011 Indonesian film
- ?: A Question Mark, a 2012 Indian film
- Question Mark (TV program), a 1963–1964 Canadian current affairs television program
- "?" (Lost), an episode of Lost

== Music ==
=== Albums ===
- ? (Bersuit album), 2007
- ? (Enuff Z'nuff album), 2004
- ? (Neal Morse album), 2005
- ? (Nena album) or the title song, 1984
- ? (XXXTentacion album), 2018
- ?, by Eason Chan, 2011
- ?, an EP by Modwheelmood, 2003

=== Songs ===
- "?", by MF Doom from Operation: Doomsday, 1999
- "?", by Outkast from Stankonia, 2000
- "?", by Tate McRae from I Used to Think I Could Fly, 2022
- "? (Modern Industry)", by Fishbone from Fishbone, 1985

== Science and technology ==
- Question Mark (aircraft), an aircraft that set the flight endurance record in 1929
- Question mark (butterfly) or Polygonia interrogationis
- ? function or Minkowski's question-mark function
- ?:, in computer programming, a ternary operator
- Elvis operator, a binary operator in certain computer programming languages
- Safe navigation operator, a binary operator in object-oriented programming
- ?, the why not connective in linear logic
- �, the Unicode replacement character
- ⚳, the symbol for the dwarf planet Ceres
- ʔ, the IPA symbol for the glottal stop

== People ==
- Seung-Hui Cho or Question Mark, Virginia Tech massacre shooter
- Rudy "?" Martinez, singer in ? and the Mysterians

== Other uses ==
- ? (bistro), a restaurant in Belgrade, Serbia
- ? (CONFIG.SYS directive)
- ? (chess), in chess annotation symbols, indicates a mistake

== See also ==
- ? and the Mysterians, an American band
- ?? (disambiguation)
- Upside-down question and exclamation marks
- Question (disambiguation)
- Question The Mark, a Welsh punk band
- Matthew Lesko or question mark guy, American author and infomercial host
- Interrobang, the nonstandard mix of a question mark and an exclamation mark
