= Question (disambiguation) =

A question may be either a linguistic expression used to make a request for information, or the request itself.

Question(s), The Question(s) or A Question may also refer to:

== Literature ==
- Question (character) or The Question, one of several DC Comics superheroes
  - Renee Montoya, The Question, heir to the original character
- "Question" (short story), a 1955 story by Isaac Asimov
- "A Question", a 1942 poem by Robert Frost
- La Question (The Question), a 1958 book by Henri Alleg
- Questions: Philosophy for Young People, a peer-reviewed scholarly journal
- The Question, a 1979 novel by Ghalib Halasa

== Films ==
- The Question (film), 1977 film by Laurent Heynemann
- The Question (1917 film), 1917 film by Perry N. Vekroff

== Music ==
=== Albums ===
- Question (EP), by CLC, 2015
- A Question (album), by Sacred Reich, 1991
- La question (album), by Françoise Hardy, 1971, or the title track
- The Question (The Slackers album), 1998
- The Question (Emery album), 2005
- The Question, an EP by Eden xo, 2019
- Questions (album), by Paul Bley, 1985

=== Songs ===
- "Question" (Lloyd Price song), 1960
- "Question" (The Moody Blues song), 1970
- "Question!", by System of a Down, 2005
- "Question...?", by Taylor Swift, 2022
- ”Question”, by Alex Aiono, 2017
- "Question", by Old 97's from Satellite Rides, 2001
- "Question", by Stray Kids from I Am Who, 2018
- "Question", by Uriah Heep from Sonic Origami, 1998
- "La question", by Gaëtan Roussel from Trafic, 2018
- "The Question" (song), by Concept of One with Noel Pagan, 1990
- "Questions" (Chris Brown song), 2017
- "Questions" (Tamia song), 2004
- "Questions", by Aṣa from Beautiful Imperfection, 2010
- "Questions", by Buffalo Springfield from Last Time Around, 1968
- "Questions", by INXS from Welcome to Wherever You Are, 1992
- "Questions", by Jennifer Paige from Jennifer Paige, 1998
- "Questions", by Little Big Town from Nightfall, 2020
- "Questions", by Lost Frequencies, 2022
- "Questions", by Maisie Peters from Florescence, 2026
- "Questions", by Manfred Mann's Earth Band from The Roaring Silence, 1976
- "Questions", by Middle Kids from Today We're the Greatest, 2021
- "Questions", by Moneybagg Yo from Heartless, 2017
- "Questions", by Pop Smoke from Faith, 2021
- "Questions", by Tommy Emmanuel from Only, 2000
- "Questions", by Xentrix from For Whose Advantage?, 1990

=== Performers ===
- The Questions, a Scottish pop band
- Question?, a Japanese group promoted by Johnny & Associates

== Other uses ==
- an element in a questionnaire (primarily in social research)
- an element of an exam (in educational assessment)
- Ballot question, in a referendum
- National question, a political and diplomatic issue regarding the status of a territory
- Research question, a question that a research project sets out to answer
- Questioning (infinitive form: to question), another term for police interrogation
- Questions (game), a game played by asking questions
- Masá’il (مسائل) or "Questions", the fifteenth month of the Bahá'í calendar

== See also ==
- Question mark (disambiguation)
- Answer (disambiguation)
- Questions and answers (disambiguation)
- Interrogative, for grammatical rules for question formation
- Inquiry
- Ask (disambiguation)
