= Sequence point =

Concept in computer programming

In C and C++, a sequence point defines any point in a computer program’s execution at which it is guaranteed that all side effects of previous evaluations will have been performed, and no side effects from subsequent evaluations have yet been performed. They are a core concept for determining the validity of and, if valid, the possible results of expressions. Adding more sequence points is sometimes necessary to make an expression defined and to ensure a single valid order of evaluation.

Documentation for C11 and C++11 stopped using the term "sequence point" and now uses alternative terms:"ISO/IEC 14882:2024"."A finer-grained alternative to sequence points (revised) (WG21/N2239 J16/07-0099)"."Order of evaluation".

1. An expression's evaluation can be "sequenced before" the evaluation of another expression. (Equivalently, the other expression's evaluation can be "sequenced after" that of the first.)
2. The expression's evaluation is "indeterminately sequenced", meaning that one is "sequenced before" the other, but which is unspecified.
3. The expression's evaluation is "unsequenced", meaning the operations in each expression may be interleaved.

The execution of unsequenced evaluations can overlap, leading to potentially catastrophic undefined behavior if they share state. This situation can arise in parallel computing, causing race conditions, but undefined behavior can also result in single-threaded situations. For example, a[i] = i++; (where a is an array and i is an integer) has undefined behavior.

In earlier C standards (such as C89 and C99), sequence points were defined to occur at specific locations in code, including at the end of a full expression (such as a statement), after the evaluation of the first operand of the logical AND (&&) and logical OR (||) operators, after the first operand of the conditional (?:) operator, and at function call boundaries after all arguments have been evaluated."Sequence point rules in C and C++".

== Examples of ambiguity ==
Consider two functions f() and g(). In C and C++, the + operator is not associated with a sequence point, and therefore in the expression f() + g() it is possible that either f() or g() will be executed first. The comma operator introduces a sequence point, and therefore in the code f(), g() the order of evaluation is defined: first f() is called, and then g() is called.

Sequence points also come into play when the same variable is modified more than once within a single expression. An often-cited example is the C expression i=i++, which apparently both assigns i its previous value and increments i. The final value of i is ambiguous, because, depending on the order of expression evaluation, the increment may occur before, after, or interleaved with the assignment. The definition of a particular language might specify one of the possible behaviors or simply say the behavior is undefined. In C and C++, evaluating such an expression yields undefined behavior. Other languages, such as C#, define the precedence of the assignment operator and the increment operator in such a way that the result of the expression i=i++ is guaranteed.

== Behavior ==
=== Up to C++03 ===
In C and C++, sequence points occur in the following places. (In C++, overloaded operators act like functions, and thus operators that have been overloaded introduce sequence points in the same way as function calls.)

1. Between evaluation of the left and right operands of the && (logical AND), || (logical OR) (as part of short-circuit evaluation), and comma operators. For example, in the expression *p++ != 0 && *q++ != 0, all side effects of the sub-expression *p++ != 0 are completed before any attempt to access q.
2. Between the evaluation of the first operand of the ternary conditional operator and its second or third operand. For example, in the expression a = (*p++) ? (*p++) : 0 there is a sequence point after the first *p++, meaning it has already been incremented by the time the second instance is executed.
3. At the end of a full expression. This category includes expression statements (such as the assignment a=b;), return statements, the controlling expressions of if, switch, while, or do-while statements, and each of the three expressions in a for statement.
4. Before a function is entered in a function call. The order in which the arguments are evaluated is not specified, but this sequence point means that all of their side effects are complete before the function is entered. In the expression f(i++) + g(j++) + h(k++), f is called with a parameter of the original value of i, but i is incremented before entering the body of f. Similarly, j and k are updated before entering g and h respectively. However, it is not specified in which order f(), g(), h() are executed, nor in which order i, j, k are incremented. If the body of f accesses the variables j and k, it might find both, neither, or just one of them to have been incremented. (The function call f(a,b,c) is not a use of the comma operator; the order of evaluation for a, b, and c is unspecified.)
5. At a function return, after the return value is copied into the calling context. (This sequence point is only specified in the C++ standard; it is present only implicitly in C.)
6. At the end of an initializer; for example, after the evaluation of 5 in the declaration int a = 5;.
7. Between each declarator in each declarator sequence; for example, between the two evaluations of a++ in int x = a++, y = a++. (This is not an example of the comma operator.)
8. After each conversion associated with an input/output format specifier. For example, in the expression printf("foo %n %d", &a, 42), there is a sequence point after the %n is evaluated and before printing 42.

=== C11 and C++11 ===
C++11 brought diverse changes, including features that improve the language's performance, usability, and multithreading. Partially because of the introduction of language support for threads, C11 and C++11 introduced new terminology for evaluation order. An operation may be “sequenced before” another, the two can be “indeterminately sequenced” (one must complete before the other), or the two can be “unsequenced” (the operations in each expression may be interleaved).

=== C++17 ===
C++17 restricted several aspects of evaluation order. The new expression will always perform the memory allocation before evaluating the constructor arguments. The operators <<, >>, ., .*, ->*, and the subscript and function call operator are guaranteed to be evaluated left to right (whether they are overloaded or not). For example, the code

std::cout << a() << b() << c(); // parsed as (((std::cout << a()) << b()) << c());

is newly guaranteed to call a, b, and c in that order. The right-hand side of any assignment-like operator is evaluated before the left-hand side, so that b() *= a(); is guaranteed to evaluate a first. Finally, although the order in which function parameters are evaluated remains implementation-defined, the compiler is no longer allowed to interleave sub-expressions across multiple parameters.

== See also ==
- Memory barrier
