= Short-circuit evaluation =

Programming language construct

Short-circuit evaluation, minimal evaluation, or McCarthy evaluation (after John McCarthy) is the semantics of some Boolean operators in some programming languages in which the second argument is executed or evaluated only if the first argument does not suffice to determine the value of the expression: when the first argument of the AND function evaluates to false, the overall value must be false; and when the first argument of the OR function evaluates to true, the overall value must be true.

In programming languages with lazy evaluation (Lisp, Perl, Haskell), the usual Boolean operators short-circuit. In others (Ada, Java, Delphi), both short-circuit and standard Boolean operators are available. For some Boolean operations, like exclusive or (XOR), it is impossible to short-circuit, because both operands are needed to determine a result.

Short-circuit operators are, in effect, control structures rather than simple arithmetic operators, as they are not strict. In imperative language terms (notably C and C++), where side effects are important, short-circuit operators introduce a sequence point: they completely evaluate the first argument, including any side effects, before (optionally) processing the second argument. ALGOL 68 used proceduring to achieve user-defined short-circuit operators and procedures.

The use of short-circuit operators has been criticized as problematic:

The conditional connectives — "cand" and "cor" for short — are ... less innocent than they might seem at first sight. For instance, cor does not distribute over cand: compare

(A cand B) cor C with (A cor C) cand (B cor C);

in the case ¬A ∧ C , the second expression requires B to be defined, the first one does not. Because the conditional connectives thus complicate the formal reasoning about programs, they are better avoided.

— Edsger W. Dijkstra

== Definition ==
In any programming language that implements short-circuit evaluation, the expression x and y is equivalent to the conditional expression if x then y else x, and the expression x or y is equivalent to if x then x else y. In either case, x is only evaluated once.

The generalized definition above accommodates loosely typed languages that have more than the two truth-values True and False, where short-circuit operators may return the last evaluated subexpression. This is called "last value" in the table below. For a strictly-typed language, the expression is simplified to if x then y else false and if x then true else y respectively for the Boolean case.

=== Precedence ===
Although AND takes precedence over OR in many languages, this is not a universal property of short-circuit evaluation. An example of the two operators taking the same precedence and being left-associative with each other is POSIX shell's command-list syntax.

The following simple left-to-right evaluator enforces a precedence of AND over OR by a continue:

function short-circuit-eval (operators, values)
    let result := True
    for each (op, val) in (operators, values):
        if op = "AND" && result = False
            continue
        else if op = "OR" && result = True
            return result
        else
            result := val
    return result

=== Formalization ===
Short-circuit logic, with or without side-effects, have been formalized based on Hoare's conditional. A result is that non-short-circuiting operators can be defined out of short-circuit logic to have the same sequence of evaluation.

=== Comparison with bitwise operators ===
& and | are bitwise operators that occur in many programming languages. The major difference is that bitwise operations operate on the individual bits of a binary numeral, whereas conditional operators operate on logical operations. Additionally, expressions either side of a bitwise operator are always evaluated. In some languages, including Java and C#, they can be used on Boolean operands to force both sides to be evaluated.

if (expression1 || expression2 || expression3)

If expression 1 is true, expressions 2 and 3 are not checked.

if (expression1 | expression2 | expression3)

This checks expressions 2 and 3, even if expression 1 is true.

Short-circuit operators can thus reduce run times by avoiding unnecessary calculations. They can also avoid null exceptions when expression 1 checks whether an object is valid.

== Support in common programming, hardware-description and scripting languages ==
The following table is restricted to common programming languages and the basic Boolean operators for logical conjunction AND and logical disjunction OR. Bitwise operators are shown only for languages that allow them to be used as eager Boolean operators and have the same return type.

Many languages have other non-strict operators, notably conditional expressions with varying syntax, such as the ternary conditional. The Elvis operator is syntax for a short-circuit AND which returns the last value.

Boolean operators in common languages
Language	Eager operators	Short-circuit operators	Result type
Ada	and, or	and then, or else	Boolean
ALGOL 68	and, &, ∧ ; or, ∨	andf , orf (both user defined)	Boolean
APL	∧, ∨	:AndIf, :OrIf	Boolean
awk	none	&&, ||	Boolean
C, Objective-C	&, | (Note: The bitwise operators behave like Boolean operators when both arguments are of type bool or take only the values 0 or 1.)	&&, ||	int
C++ (Note: When overloaded, the operators && and || are eager and can return any type.)	none	&&, ||	Boolean
C#	&, |	&&, ||	Boolean
D (Note: This only applies to runtime-evaluated expressions, static if and static assert. Expressions in static initializers or manifest constants use eager evaluation.)	&, |	&&, ||	Boolean
Eiffel	and, or	and then, or else	Boolean
Erlang	and, or	andalso, orelse	Boolean
Forth	AND, OR, XOR (Note: Forth 2012 Standard Core only provides words for bitwise logic, so "1 2 OR" leaves 0 on the stack.)	none	Numeric
Fortran	.and., .or. (evaluation order is undefined) (Note: In Fortran, the clauses may be evaluated in any order and optionally short-circuited)		Boolean
Go, Haskell, OCaml (Note: In lua and OCaml, bitwise operators &, | (OCaml land, lor) are restricted to integers and cannot be used with Booleans.)	none	&&, ||	Boolean
Java, R, Swift	&, |	&&, || (Note: In Java, these along with ?…: are sometimes referred to as "conditional operators".)	Boolean
JavaScript	none	&&, ||	Last value
Julia	none	&&, ||	Last value
Kotlin	and, or	&&, ||	Boolean
Lisp, Lua, Scheme	none	and, or	Last value
MATLAB (Note: The operator & behaves like a short-circuit operator when used in a statement following if or while.)	&, |	&, |, &&, ||	Boolean
MUMPS (M)	&, !	none	Numeric
Modula-2	none	AND, OR	Boolean
Pascal	and, or (Note: ISO/IEC 10206:1990 Extended Pascal allows, but does not require, short-circuiting.) (Note: Delphi and Free Pascal default to short circuit evaluation. This may be changed by compiler options but does not seem to be used widely.)	and_then, or_else	Boolean
Perl	&, |	&&, and, ||, or	Last value
PHP	none	&&, and, ||, or	Boolean
POSIX shell, Bash	none	&&, ||	Numeric (exit code)
PowerShell Scripting Language	none	-and, -or	Boolean
Python	&, |	and, or	Last value
Ruby	&, |	&&, and, ||, or	Last value
Rust	&, |	&&, ||	Boolean
Smalltalk	&, |	and:, or: (Note: Smalltalk uses short-circuit semantics as long as the argument to and: is a block (e.g., false and: [Transcript show: 'Wont see me']).)	Boolean
Standard ML	Unknown	andalso, orelse	Boolean
Visual Basic .NET	And, Or	AndAlso, OrElse	Boolean
Visual Basic, Visual Basic for Applications (VBA)	And, Or	none	Numeric
VHDL	none	and, or, nand, nor (Note: In VHDL, short-circuit evaluation is defined only for the predefined scalar types boolean and bit, using the logical operators and, or, nand, and nor. When these operators are applied to std_logic (from ieee.std_logic_1164), they are overloaded as functions and are eager, so both operands are always evaluated.)	Boolean

== Common use ==
=== Avoiding undesired side effects of the second argument ===
Usual example, using a C-based language:

int denom = 0;
if (denom != 0 && num / denom) {
    ... // ensures that calculating num/denom never results in divide-by-zero error   
}

Consider the following example:

int a = 0;
if (a != 0 && myfunc(b)) {
    doSomething();
}

In this example, short-circuit evaluation guarantees that myfunc(b) is never called. This is because a != 0 evaluates to false. This feature permits two useful programming constructs.

1. If the first sub-expression checks whether an expensive computation is needed and the check evaluates to false, one can eliminate expensive computation in the second argument.
2. It permits a construct where the first expression guarantees a condition without which the second expression may cause a run-time error.

Both are illustrated in the following C snippet where minimal evaluation prevents both null pointer dereference and excess memory fetches:

bool isFirstCharValidAlphaUnsafe(const char* p) {
    return isalpha(p[0]); // SEGFAULT highly possible with p == NULL
}

bool isFirstCharValidAlpha(const char* p) {
    return p != NULL && isalpha(p[0]); // 1) no unneeded isalpha() execution with p == NULL, 2) no SEGFAULT risk
}

=== Idiomatic conditional construct ===
Since minimal evaluation is part of an operator's semantic definition and not an optional optimization, a number of coding idioms rely on it as a succinct conditional construct. Examples include:

Perl idioms:

some_condition or die;    # Abort execution if some_condition is false
some_condition and die;   # Abort execution if some_condition is true

POSIX shell idioms:

modprobe -q some_module && echo "some_module installed" || echo "some_module not installed"

This idiom presumes that echo cannot fail.

== Possible problems ==
=== Untested second condition leads to unperformed side effect ===
Despite these benefits, minimal evaluation may cause problems for programmers who do not realize (or forget) it is happening. For example, in the code

if (expressionA && myFunc(b)) {
    doSomething();
}

if myFunc(b) is supposed to perform some required operation regardless of whether doSomething() is executed, such as allocating system resources, and expressionA evaluates as false, then myFunc(b) will not execute, which could cause problems. Some programming languages, such as Java, have two operators, one that employs minimal evaluation and one that does not, to avoid this problem.

Problems with unperformed side effect statements can be easily solved with proper programming style, i.e., not using side effects in Boolean statements, as using values with side effects in evaluations tends to generally make the code opaque and error-prone.

=== Reduced efficiency due to constraining optimizations ===
Short-circuiting can lead to errors in branch prediction on modern central processing units (CPUs), and dramatically reduce performance; notable examples include highly optimized ray intersections in ray tracing. Some compilers can detect such cases and emit faster code, but programming language semantics may constrain such optimizations.

An example of a compiler unable to optimize for such a case is Java's Hotspot virtual machine (VM) as of 2012.

== See also ==
- Don't-care term
- Null coalescing operator
- Ternary conditional operator
