= Answer =

Answer commonly refers to a response to a question.

Answer may also refer to:

== Music ==
=== Albums ===
- Answer (Angela Aki album), 2009
- Answer (Supercar album), 2004
- Answers (album), 1994
- The Answers, an album by Blue October

=== Songs ===
- "Answer" (Tohoshinki song)
- "Answer" (Flow song), 2007
- "Answer" (Tyler, the Creator song), 2013
- "Answer", by Sarah McLachlan from her 2003 album Afterglow
- "Answer", by Mayu Maeshima, opening song from the 2021 anime Full Dive
- "Answer", by Ateez
- "Answers", a 2020 song by Au5

=== Other music ===
- An element of a fugue

== Publications ==
- Answers (periodical), British weekly paper founded in 1888, initially titled Answers to Correspondents
- Answers, an American magazine published by Answers in Genesis
- "Answer", a 1954 science-fiction story by Fredric Brown

== Answer engines ==
- Answers.com
- Yahoo! Answers

== Other uses ==
- Answer (law), any reply to a question, counter-statement or defense in a legal procedure
- English ship Answer (1590), a Royal Navy galleon
- HMS Answer, a cancelled Amphion-class submarine
- Answer Studio, a company launched by employees of Walt Disney Animation Japan since its closure in 2004
- A.N.S.W.E.R. (Act Now to Stop War and End Racism), an American protest group
- Answer (Guilty Gear), a playable character in the Guilty Gear series of video games
- Cure Answer, the protagonist of Star Detective Precure!

== See also ==
- The Answer (disambiguation)
- Question answering, a computer science discipline
- Questions and answers (disambiguation)
- Ask (disambiguation)
- Question (disambiguation)
