= ??= =

??= may refer to:

- The trigraph which represents the number sign in C and C++
- The null coalescing assignment operator, in some programming languages

== See also ==
- ?= (disambiguation)
- =? (disambiguation)
