= ?= =

?= may refer to:

- Regular expression § look-ahead assertions
- The end of a MIME § Encoded-Word

== See also ==
- =? (disambiguation)
- ??= (disambiguation)
- ?:
