= Logical expression =

Logical expression may refer to:

- Well-formed formula
- Boolean expression
