= ?? =

?? (two question marks), also written as U+2047 ⁇ DOUBLE QUESTION MARK, may refer to:

- A symbol indicating a blunder in chess annotation symbols
- The null coalescing operator, in some programming languages

== See also ==
- Question mark (disambiguation)
