= =? =

=? may refer to:

- Symbol to indicate the start of encoding in a MIME encoded-word
- Operator in Fortran to output the NAMELIST to stdout
- ≟, undetermined equality, or 'questioned equal to'

== See also ==
- Search for '=?' on Wikipedia
- ?= (disambiguation)
- ??= (disambiguation)
- ?:
