= Conditional disjunction =

In logic, the term conditional disjunction can refer to:

- conditioned disjunction, a ternary logical connective introduced by Alonzo Church
- a rule in classical logic that the material conditional ¬p → q is equivalent to the disjunction p ∨ q, so that these two formulae are interchangeable - see Negation
