= The Answer =

The Answer or The Answers may refer to:

== Arts and entertainment ==
=== Music ===
- The Answer (band), a rock band from Northern Ireland

==== Albums ====
- The Answer (album), a 1997 album by Gloria Gaynor
- The Answer, a 2010 EP, or its title track, by Unkle
- The Answers, an album by Blue October

==== Songs ====
- "The Answer", by Audio Adrenaline from the album Kings & Queens
- "The Answer", by Bad Religion from the album Generator
- "The Answer", by Bloc Party from the album Bloc Party
- "The Answer", by Blue October from the album The Answers
- "The Answer", by Britney Spears from the album In the Zone
- "The Answer", by Candlebox from the album Into the Sun
- "The Answer", by Chris Tomlin from the album Always
- "The Answer", by Joss Stone from the album Water for Your Soul
- "The Answer", by Memphis May Fire from the album Unconditional
- "The Answer", by Myka Relocate from the album Lies to Light the Way
- "The Answer", by Richie Sambora from the album Stranger in This Town
- "The Answer", by Savages from the album Adore Life
- "The Answer", a 2020 AB6IX single

=== Literature ===
- The Answer or Answer (comics), a fictional character in Marvel Comics
- The Answer (novel), a book in the Animorphs series
- "The Answer" (short story), a 1959 science fiction short story by H. Beam Piper
- The Questionnaire (Salomon novel), also published as The Answers

=== Other media ===
- "The Answer" (Steven Universe), an episode from the American animated television series
- The Answer (film), 1916 British short film
- "The Answer" (The Good Place), an episode from the American comedy television series

== Other uses ==
- Nickname of Allen Iverson, American basketball player
- The Answer, a 1929 Paramount Cabinaire plane used for a non-stop endurance record attempt

== See also ==
- Answer (disambiguation)
- Die Antwoord (Afrikaans for "The Answer"), a South African hip hop group
