= ASK =

ASK may refer to:

- ASK Group, a software company
- ASK Italian, a UK restaurant chain
- ASK Kodansha, a video game developer currently known simply as ASK
- ASK Riga, a Latvian basketball club
- FK ASK, a Latvian former football club
- ASK1, apoptosis signal-regulating kinase 1
- Aaru Sundarimaarude Katha, a 2013 Malayalam thriller film
- American School of Kuwait
- Amplitude-shift keying, a type of signal modulation
- Årets Svenska Kvinna (ÅSK), Swedish Woman of the Year award
- Available seat kilometre, an airline's passenger carrying capacity
- Schleicher ASK 13, a glider aircraft
- IATA code for Yamoussoukro Airport

== See also ==
- Ask (disambiguation)
