= English ship Answer (1590) =

Galleon of the English Royal Navy

History

Kingdom of England
- Name: Answer
- Builder: Matthew Baker
- Launched: 1590
- Commissioned: 1590
- Fate: Sold 17 June 1629

General characteristics
- Class & type: Small Galleon; Fourth Rate - 1626
- Tons burthen: 219/274.6 tons bm
- Length: 65 ft 0 in (19.8 m) keel
- Beam: 26 ft 0 in (7.9 m)
- Depth of hold: 13 ft 0 in (4.0 m)
- Propulsion: Sail
- Sail plan: ship-rigged
- Complement: 100 (1603)
- Armament: 5 × demi-culverins; 6 × sakers; 6 × minions; 2 x falcons

Answer was a small galleon in the service of the English Royal Navy. She spent her early career in expeditions as far as Cadiz and the Azores. She was later assigned to the Channel Guard during two more attempts by Philip II of Spain to invade England. She maintained this assignment until she went to the Irish Station then back to the English Channel. She was finally sold in 1629.

Answer was the first named vessel in the English and Royal Navies.

== Construction and specifications ==
She was built on the Thames possibly at Deptford under the guidance of Master Shipwright Richard Chapman. She was launched in 1590. Her dimensions were 60 feet 0 inches (18.3 metres) for keel with a breadth of 26 feet 0 inches (7.9 metres) and a depth of hold of 13 feet 0 inches (4.0 metres). Her tonnage was between 202.9 and 253.5 tons.

Her gun armament was in 1603 19 guns consisting of five demi-culverines, (Note: A demi-culverin was a gun of 3,400 pounds with a four inch bore firing a 9.5 pound shot with an eight pound powder charge.) six sakers, (Note: A sacar or saker was a gun of 1,400 pounds with a 3.5 inch bore firing a 5.5 pound shot with an 5.5 pound powder charge.) six minions (Note: A minion was a gun of 1,000 pounds with a 3.5 inch bore firing a 4 pound shot with an 4 pound powder charge.) and two falcons (Note: A falcon was a gun of 660 pounds with a 2.5 inch bore firing a 2 pound shot with a 3.5 pound powder charge.) plus two fowlers (Note: A fowler was an anti-personnel breech-loading gun that fired either stone or grape shot. the weapon weighed about 5 cwt and the breech weighed another 1 cwt.) Her manning was around 100 officers and men in 1603.

== Commissioned service ==
She was commissioned in 1599 thru 1600 under Captain Walter Gore for service with Sir Richard Leveson's Channel Guard in 1599. She was with the Channel Guard until July 1599. In 1601 she was under Captain Thomas Coverte for the Thames Guard. In 1602 she was under the command of Captain Matthew Bardgate for service in the English Channel. She was rebuilt at Chatham Dockyard in May 1604.

== Disposition ==
Answer was sold at Rochester on 17 June 1629.
