= Boolean expression =

Expression in a computer program

In computer science, a Boolean expression (also known as logical expression) is an expression used in programming languages that produces a Boolean value when evaluated. A Boolean value is either true or false. A Boolean expression may be composed of a combination of the Boolean constants True/False or Yes/No, Boolean-typed variables, Boolean-valued operators, and Boolean-valued functions.

Boolean expressions correspond to propositional formulas in logic and are associated to Boolean circuits.

== Boolean operators ==
Most programming languages have the Boolean operators OR, AND and NOT; in C and some languages inspired by it, these are represented by "||" (double pipe character), "&&" (double ampersand) and "!" (exclamation point) respectively, while the corresponding bitwise operations are represented by "|", "&" and "~" (tilde). In the mathematical literature the symbols used are often "+" (plus), "·" (dot) and overbar, or "∨" (vel), "∧" (et) and "¬" (not) or "′" (prime).

Some languages, e.g., Perl and Ruby, have two sets of Boolean operators, with identical functions but different precedence. Typically these languages use and, or and not for the lower precedence operators.

Some programming languages derived from PL/I have a bit string type and use BIT(1) rather than a separate Boolean type. In those languages the same operators serve for Boolean operations and bitwise operations. The languages represent OR, AND, NOT and EXCLUSIVE OR by "|", "&", "¬" (infix) and "¬" (prefix).

=== Short-circuit operators ===
Some programming languages, e.g., Ada, have short-circuit Boolean operators. These operators use a lazy evaluation, that is, if the value of the expression can be determined from the left hand Boolean expression then they do not evaluate the right hand Boolean expression. As a result, there may be side effects that only occur for one value of the left hand operand.

== Examples ==
- The expression 5 > 3 is evaluated as true.
- The expression 3 > 5 is evaluated as false.
- 5>=3 and 3<=5 are equivalent Boolean expressions, both of which are evaluated as true.
- Of course, most Boolean expressions will contain at least one variable (X > 3), and often more (X > Y).

== See also ==
- Expression (computer science)
- Expression (mathematics)
- Boolean function
