= Eden xo discography =

- Singles: 20
- Extended plays: 5
- Music videos: 15
- Promotional singles: 3

The discography of American singer-songwriter Eden xo (formerly Jessie Malakouti) consists of four extended plays, twenty singles (including seven as a featured artist), three promotional singles, and fifteen music videos (including two as a featured artist).

== Extended plays ==
Title	Album details
Push It (The Remixes)	Released: February 14, 2011; Format: Digital download; Label: Prospect Park
Show Me Your Tan Lines	Released: June 14, 2011; Format: CD, digital download; Label: Prospect Park
Let's Get Naughty (The Remixes)	Released: January 31, 2012; Format: Digital download; Label: Prospect Park
Too Cool to Dance (Remixes)	Released: September 30, 2014; Format: Digital download; Label: Virgin
The Question	Released: June 28, 2019; Format: Digital download, LP, streaming; Label: AlphaOmega

== Singles ==
=== As lead artist ===
Title	Year	Peak chart positions		Album
Title	Year	US Dance	US Pop	Album
"Trash Me"	2008	—	—	Non-album singles
"Outsider"	2008	—		Non-album singles
"Standing Up for the Lonely"	2009	—	—	Non-album singles
"Push It" (featuring Yelawolf)	2011	7	—	Show Me Your Tan Lines
"Let's Get Naughty"	2011	19	—	Non-album singles
"Too Cool to Dance"	2014	14	31	Non-album singles
"The Weekend"	2015	—	—	Non-album singles
"Hold Me Now"	2015	—	—	Non-album singles
"El Barrio"	2016	—	—	Non-album singles
"Drips Gold" (featuring Raja Kumari)	2017	—	—	Non-album singles
"Say That Again" (featuring Travis Mills)	2017	—	—	Non-album singles
"Cinematic Goodbye (Acoustic)"	2018	—	—	Non-album singles
"Dirty Blonde"	2018	—	—	Non-album singles
"Have It All"	2019	—	—	The Question
"Bad Girls Go to Heaven" (with Bonnie McKee)	2019	—	—	Non-album singles
"Dance Monkey"	2019	—	—	Non-album singles
"American Youth French Kissing"	2020	—	—	Non-album singles
"Paradise Found"	2020	—	—	Non-album singles
"Bad Apple"	2023	—	—	

=== As featured artist ===
Title	Year	Album
"It's Your Birthday B!#ch" (DJ Felli Fel featuring Lil Jon and Jessie Malakouti)	2012	Non-album singles
"Dirrty Up" (Bobby Newberry featuring Jessie and The Toy Boys)	2012	Non-album singles
"Rewind" (LA Riots and ThankYouX featuring Jessie Malakouti)	2013	Non-album singles
"Savior" (Bobby Newberry featuring Jessie Malakouti)	2014	#TheNewBerrySpecial
"Sideline" (Swick featuring Eden xo)	2016	Non-album single
"Flash, Flash, Glow, Glow" (The Happy Bats featuring Eden xo)	2018	Non-album single
"Color Me In" (The Hot Damns featuring Eden xo)	2020	Non-album single

=== Promotional singles ===
Title	Year	Album
"Valentine"	2011	Show Me Your Tan Lines
"We Own the Night"	2011	Show Me Your Tan Lines
"Sorry for Myself"	2019	The Question

== Songwriting ==
Title	Year	Artist	Album
"Egoísta" (English version) (with Pitbull)	2010	Belinda	Carpe Diem
"Wasted Love"	2011	Liz Primo	Exposed
"State of War" (featuring Goodwill & Kira Puru)	2015	Paul Mac	Holiday from Me
"Riding Shotgun" (with Oliver Nelson featuring Bonnie McKee)	2017	Kygo	Kids In Love
"Lonely for You" (featuring Bonnie McKee)	2019	Armin van Buuren	Balance
"Naked"	2020	Ava Max	Heaven & Hell

== Music videos ==
=== As lead artist ===
Title	Year	Director(s)
"Trash Me"	2008	Kerry Bellessa
"Outsider"	2008	Kerry Bellessa
"Push It" (featuring Yelawolf)	2011	Don Tyler
"Let's Get Naughty"	2011	Don Tyler
"Runaway"	2012	Daniel Hanna
"On with My Bad Self"	2012	Daniel Hanna and Jessie Malakouti
"White Girl Wasted"	2013	Andi Elloway
"Too Cool to Dance"	2014	Sarah McColgan
"The Weekend"	2015	Noel Maitland
"El Barrio"	2016	Clement Oberto
"Drips Gold"	2017	Angela Peterman
"Dirty Blonde"	2018	—N/a
"So Lucky"	2019	Johnny Wujek

=== As featured artist ===
Title	Year	Director(s)
"It's Your Birthday B!#ch" (DJ Felli Fel featuring Lil Jon and Jessie Malakouti)	2012	Kai Henry
"Dirrty Up" (Bobby Newberry featuring Jessie and The Toy Boys)	2012	Don Tyler
