= Conditioned disjunction =

Type of connective in logic

- Definition: $(q \to p) \land (\neg q \to r)$
- Truth table: $(0100 0111)$

Normal forms
- Disjunctive: $\overline p \overline q r + p \overline q r + pq\overline r + pqr$
- Conjunctive: $(\overline q + p) (q + r)$
- Zhegalkin polynomial: $qp \oplus qr \oplus r$

Post's lattices
- 0-preserving: yes
- 1-preserving: yes
- Monotone: no
- Affine: no
- Self-dual: no

In logic, conditioned disjunction (sometimes called conditional disjunction) is a ternary logical connective introduced by Church. Given operands p, q, and r, which represent truth-valued propositions, the meaning of the conditioned disjunction [p, q, r] is given by

$$[p, q, r] \Leftrightarrow (q \to p) \land (\neg q \to r).$$

In words, [p, q, r] is equivalent to: "if q, then p, else r", or "p or r, according as q or not q". This may also be stated as "q implies p, and not q implies r". So, for any values of p, q, and r, the value of [p, q, r] is the value of p when q is true, and is the value of r otherwise.

The conditioned disjunction is also equivalent to

$$(q \land p) \lor (\neg q \land r)$$

and has the same truth table as the ternary conditional operator ?: in many programming languages (with $[b, a, c]$ being equivalent to a ? b : c). In electronic logic terms, it may also be viewed as a single-bit multiplexer.

In conjunction with truth constants denoting each truth-value, conditioned disjunction is truth-functionally complete for classical logic. There are other truth-functionally complete ternary connectives.

== Truth table ==
The truth table for $[p,q,r]$:

$p$	$q$	$r$	$[p, q, r]$
True	True	True	True
True	True	False	True
True	False	True	True
True	False	False	False
False	True	True	False
False	True	False	False
False	False	True	True
False	False	False	False
