= Elvis operator =

Binary operator in computer programming

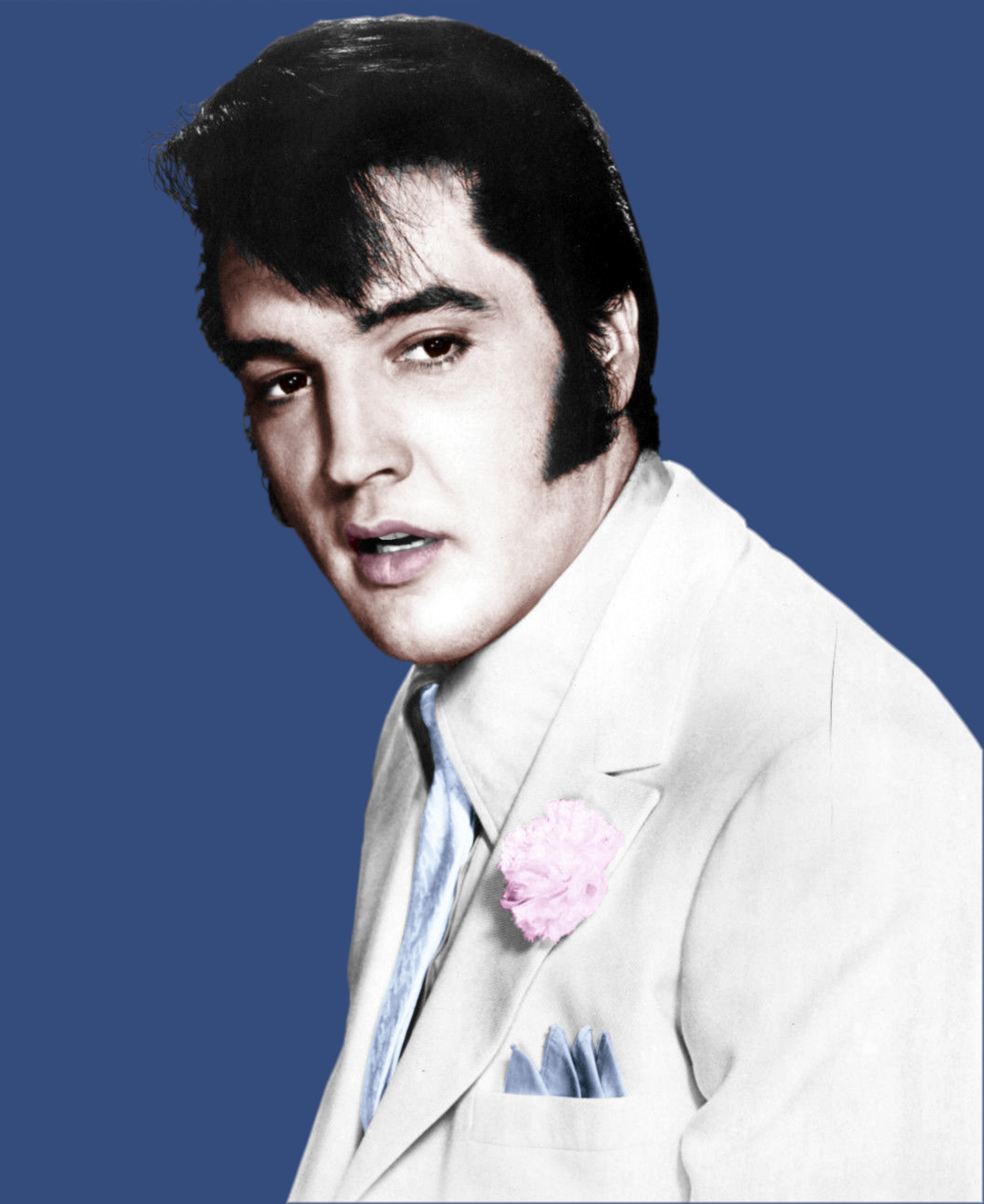
Elvis Presley, whose hair resembles the operator viewed sideways

In certain computer programming languages, the Elvis operator, often written ?:, is a binary operator that returns the first operand if its value is logically true (according to a language-dependent convention, in other words, a truthy value) or returns its second operand if the first operand is not true. That is, it is a short-circuit OR, which returns its first truthy operand.

The syntax of the Elvis operator was inspired by the ternary conditional operator, ? :, since the Elvis operator expression A ?: B is approximately equivalent to the ternary conditional expression A ? A : B.

It is called the "Elvis operator" because the notation ?:, when viewed sideways, resembles an emoticon of Elvis Presley with his signature hairstyle.

A similar operator is the null coalescing operator, where the boolean truth(iness) check is replaced with a check for non-null instead. This is usually written ??, and can be seen in languages like C# or Dart.

== Alternative syntaxes ==
In several languages, such as Common Lisp, Clojure, Lua, Object Pascal, Perl, Python, Ruby, and JavaScript, there is no need for the Elvis operator, because the language's logical disjunction operator (typically || or or) is short-circuiting and returns its first operand if it would evaluate to a truthy value, and otherwise its second operand, which may be a truthy or falsy value (rather than a Boolean true or false value, such as in C and C++). These semantics are identical to the Elvis operator.

== Example ==
=== Boolean variant ===
In a language that supports the Elvis operator, something like this:

x = f() ?: g()

will set x equal to the result of f() if that result is truthy, and to the result of g() otherwise.

It is equivalent to this example, using the conditional ternary operator:

x = f() ? f() : g()

except that it does not evaluate f() twice if it yields truthy. Note the possibility of arbitrary behaviour if f() is not a state-independent function that always returns the same result.

=== Object reference variant ===
This code will result in a reference to an object that is guaranteed to not be null. Function f() returns an object reference instead of a boolean, and may return null, which is universally regarded as falsy:

x = f() ?: "default value"

== Languages supporting the Elvis operator ==
- In GNU C and C++ (that is: in C and C++ with GCC extensions), the second operand of the ternary operator is optional. This has been the case since at least GCC 2.95.3 (March 2001), and seems to be the original Elvis operator.
- In Apache Groovy, the "Elvis operator" ?: is documented as a distinct operator; this feature was added in Groovy 1.5 (December 2007). Groovy, unlike GNU C and PHP, does not simply allow the second operand of ternary ?: to be omitted; rather, binary ?: must be written as a single operator, with no whitespace in between.
- In PHP, it is possible to leave out the middle part of the ternary operator since PHP 5.3. (June 2009).
- The Fantom programming language has the ?: binary operator that compares its first operand with null.
- In Kotlin, the Elvis operator returns its left-hand side if it is not null, and its right-hand side otherwise. A common pattern is to use it with return, like this: val foo = bar() ?: return
- In Gosu, the ?: operator returns the right operand if the left is null as well.
- In C#, the null-conditional operator, ?. is referred to as the "Elvis operator", but it does not perform the same function. Instead, the null-coalescing operator ?? does.
- In ColdFusion and CFML, the Elvis operator was introduced using the ?: syntax.
- The Xtend programming language has an Elvis operator.
- In Google's Closure Templates, the Elvis operator is a null coalescing operator, equivalent to isNonnull($a) ? $a : $b.
- In Ballerina, the Elvis operator L ?: R returns the value of L if it's not nil. Otherwise, return the value of R.
- In JavaScript, the nullish coalescing (??) operator is a logical operator that returns its right-hand side operand when its left-hand side operand is null or undefined, and otherwise returns its left-hand side operand.
- In Perl there is a logical short-circuiting disjunction || and a similar lower precedence or. They differ from the bitwise or operator | which evaluates both operands without short-circuiting. There is also a corresponding assignment operator ||= that evaluates its right-hand operand and assigns it to the left-operand unless the logical value of the left-operand is true. There is also a short-circuiting defined-or operator // which evaluates its right-operand and returns its value only if the left-operand is undefined. Finally, the corresponding assignment operator is //=. Similar exclusive-or operators are not Elvis operators as they do not short-circuit. Other short-circuiting operators are the logical-and ones && and and, but their behavior is opposite that of the Elvis operator.

== See also ==
- ?: or conditional operator, when used as a ternary operator
- Null coalescing operator, ?? operator
- Safe navigation operator, often ?.
- Spaceship operator <=>
- Option type
