= A Question =

Poem by Robert Frost

"A Question" is a short poem by Robert Frost, first published in 1942 in A Witness Tree.

== Poem ==
A voice said, Look me in the stars
And tell me truly, men of earth,
If all the soul-and-body scars
Were not too much to pay for birth.

== Interpretations ==
While it is not long, many different interpretations exist for this poem.

Many think that this poem stands for one's reflection on their past life. The poem questions whether you valued your life over death or, worse, never having been born. Did you in fact see life for all of its beauty or do you view your life as a waste? The poem asks you to analyze your life, to question whether every decision you made was for the greater good, and to learn and accept the decisions you have made in your life. One Answer to the Question would be simply to value the fact that you had the opportunity to live.

Another interpretation is that the poem gives a deep image of suffering. It portrays the fact that we live in suffering, and there is nothing we can do about it. Then the poem relays the question as to why we bear the unhappiness that is life, which makes readers think that Frost was heavily intrigued and curious about the "why."

There is also a Christian interpretation, in which God proposes the titular Question to his followers, the "men of the earth". He asks whether all the suffering and pain we go through during our lives is worth the gift of life. A similar Christian interpretation would also be that the "soul-and-body" scars represent the wounds of Christ, and thus the poem is asking whether humanity has proven itself worthy of such redemption.
