= Ask =

Ask is the active verb for a direct question.

Ask may also refer to:

== Places ==
- Ask, Akershus, a village in Gjerdrum municipality, Akershus county, Norway
- Ask, Buskerud, a village in Ringerike municipality, Buskerud county, Norway
- Ask, Vestland, a village in Askøy municipality, Vestland county, Norway
- Ask, Iran, a village in Mazandaran Province

== People ==
- Ask la Cour, Danish ballet dancer
- Beatrice Ask (born 1956), Swedish politician
- Morten Ask (born 1980), Norwegian ice hockey player
- Sten Ask (born 1943), Swedish diplomat

== Other ==
- Ask (horse), a British Thoroughbred race horse
- "Ask" (song), a 1986 song by The Smiths
- Ask and Embla, in Norse mythology
- Ask price, in economics
- Ask.com, a web search engine, formerly Ask Jeeves
- Ask.fm, a social Q&A web site
- "Ask", a song by Avail from Over the James

== See also ==
- ASK (disambiguation)
- Ascq
