= Side effect (computer science) =

Of a function, an additional effect besides returning a value

In computer science, an operation or expression is said to have a side effect if it has any observable effect other than its primary effect of reading the value of its arguments and returning a value to the invoker of the operation. Example side effects include modifying a non-local variable, a static local variable or a mutable argument passed by reference; performing I/O; or calling other functions with side-effects. In the presence of side effects, a program's behaviour may depend on history; that is, the order of evaluation matters. Understanding and debugging a function with side effects requires knowledge about the context and its possible histories. Side effects play an important role in the design and analysis of programming languages. The degree to which side effects are used depends on the programming paradigm. For example, imperative programming is commonly used to produce side effects, to update a system's state. By contrast, declarative programming is commonly used to report on the state of system, without side effects.

Functional programming aims to minimize or eliminate side effects. The lack of side effects makes it easier to do formal verification of a program. The functional language Haskell eliminates side effects such as I/O and other stateful computations by replacing them with monadic actions. Functional languages such as Standard ML, Scheme and Scala do not restrict side effects, but it is customary for programmers to avoid them.

Effect systems extend types to keep track of effects, permitting concise notation for functions with effects, while maintaining information about the extent and nature of side effects. In particular, functions without effects correspond to pure functions.

Assembly language programmers must be aware of hidden side effects—instructions that modify parts of the processor state which are not mentioned in the instruction's mnemonic. A classic example of a hidden side effect is an arithmetic instruction that implicitly modifies condition codes (a hidden side effect) while it explicitly modifies a register (the intended effect). One potential drawback of an instruction set with hidden side effects is that, if many instructions have side effects on a single piece of state, like condition codes, then the logic required to update that state sequentially may become a performance bottleneck. The problem is particularly acute on some processors designed with pipelining (since 1990) or with out-of-order execution. Such a processor may require additional control circuitry to detect hidden side effects and stall the pipeline if the next instruction depends on the results of those effects.

== Referential transparency ==
Absence of side effects is a necessary, but not sufficient, condition for referential transparency. Referential transparency means that an expression (such as a function) can be replaced with its value. This requires that the expression is pure, that is to say the expression must be deterministic (always give the same value for the same input) and side-effect free.

== Temporal side effects ==
Side effects caused by the time taken for an operation to execute are usually ignored when discussing side effects and referential transparency. There are some cases, such as with hardware timing or testing, where operations are inserted specifically for their temporal side effects e.g. sleep(5000) or for (int i = 0; i < 10000; ++i) {}. These instructions do not change state other than taking an amount of time to complete.

== Idempotence ==
A subroutine with side effects is idempotent if multiple calls of the subroutine have the same effect on the system state as a single call, in other words if the function from the system state space to itself associated with the subroutine is idempotent in the mathematical sense. For instance, consider the following Python program:

x = 0

def setx(n):
    global x
    x = n

setx(3)
assert x == 3
setx(3)
assert x == 3

setx is idempotent because the second call of setx to 3 has the same effect on the system state as the first call: x was already set to 3 after the first call, and it is still set to 3 after the second call.

A pure function is idempotent if it is idempotent in the mathematical sense. For instance, consider the following Python program:

def abs(n):
    return -n if n < 0 else n

assert abs(abs(-3)) == abs(-3)

abs is idempotent because the second call of abs to the return value of the first call to -3 returns the same value as the first call to -3.

== Example ==
One common demonstration of side effect behavior is that of the assignment operator in C. The assignment a = b is an expression that evaluates to the same value as the expression b, with the side effect of storing the R-value of b into the L-value of a. This allows multiple assignment:

a = (b = 3);  // b = 3 evaluates to 3, which then gets assigned to a

Because the operator right associates, this is equivalent to

a = b = 3;

This presents a potential hangup for novice programmers who may confuse

while (b == 3) {}  // tests if b evaluates to 3

with

while (b = 3) {}  // b = 3 evaluates to 3, which then casts to true so the loop is infinite

== See also ==
- Action at a distance (computer programming)
- Don't-care term
- Effect system
- Monad (functional programming)
- Sequence point
- Side-channel attack
- Undefined behaviour
- Unspecified behaviour
- Frame problem
