= Operator (computer programming) =

Basic programming language construct

In computer programming, an operator is a programming language construct that provides functionality that may not be possible to define as a user-defined function (e.g. sizeof in C) or has syntax different from that of a function (e.g. infix addition as in a+b). Like other programming language concepts, operator has a generally accepted, although debatable, meaning among practitioners.

Some operators are represented with symbols – characters typically not allowed for a function identifier – to allow for presentation that is more familiar looking than typical function syntax. For example, a function that tests for greater-than could be named gt, but many languages provide an infix symbolic operator so that code looks more familiar. For example, this:

if gt(x, y) then return

Can be:

if x > y then return

Some languages allow a language-defined operator to be overridden with user-defined behavior and some allow for user-defined operator symbols.

Operators may also differ semantically from functions. For example, short-circuit Boolean operations evaluate later arguments only if earlier ones are not false.

== Differences from functions ==
=== Syntax ===
Many operators differ syntactically from user-defined functions. In most languages, a function is prefix notation with fixed precedence level and associativity and often with compulsory parentheses (e.g. Func(a) or (Func a) in Lisp). In contrast, many operators are infix notation and involve different use of delimiters such as parentheses.

In general, an operator may be prefix, infix, postfix, matchfix, circumfix or bifix, and the syntax of an expression involving an operator depends on its arity (number of operands), precedence, and (if applicable), associativity. Most programming languages support binary operators and a few unary operators, with a few supporting more operands, such as the ?: operator in C, which is ternary. There are prefix unary operators, such as unary minus -x, and postfix unary operators, such as post-increment x++; and binary operations are infix, such as x + y or x = y. Infix operations of higher arity require additional symbols, such as the ternary operator ?: in C, written as a ? b : c – indeed, since this is the only common example, it is often referred to as the ternary operator. Prefix and postfix operations can support any desired arity, however, such as 1 2 3 4 +.

=== Semantics ===
The semantics of an operator may significantly differ from that of a normal function. For reference, addition is evaluated like a normal function. For example, x + y can be equivalent to a function add(x, y) in that the arguments are evaluated and then the functional behavior is applied. However, assignment is different. For example, given a = b the target a is not evaluated. Instead its value is replaced with the value of b. The scope resolution and element access operators (as in Foo::Bar and a.b, respectively, in the case of e.g. C++) operate on identifier names; not values.

In C, for instance, the array indexing operator can be used for both read access as well as assignment. In the following example, the increment operator reads the element value of an array and then assigns the element value.

++a[i];

The C++ << operator allows for fluent syntax by supporting a sequence of operators that affect a single argument. For example:

cout << "Hello" << " " << "world!" << endl;

== Ad hoc polymorphic ==
Some languages provide operators that are ad hoc polymorphic – inherently overloaded. For example, in Java the + operator sums numbers or concatenates strings.

== Customization ==
Some languages support user-defined overloading (such as C++ and Fortran). An operator, defined by the language, can be overloaded to behave differently based on the type of input.

Some languages (e.g. C, C++ and PHP) define a fixed set of operators, while others (e.g. Prolog, F#, OCaml, Haskell) allow for user-defined operators. Some programming languages restrict operator symbols to special characters like + or := while others allow names like div (e.g. Pascal), and even arbitrary names (e.g. Fortran where an upto 31 character long operator name is enclosed between dots).

Most languages do not support user-defined operators since the feature significantly complicates parsing. Introducing a new operator changes the arity and precedence lexical specification of the language, which affects phrase-level lexical analysis. Custom operators, particularly via runtime definition, often make correct static analysis of a program impossible, since the syntax of the language may be Turing-complete, so even constructing the syntax tree may require solving the halting problem, which is impossible. This occurs for Perl, for example, and some dialects of Lisp.

If a language does allow for defining new operators, the mechanics of doing so may involve meta-programming – specifying the operator in a separate language.

== Operand coercion ==
Some languages implicitly convert (aka coerce) operands to be compatible with each other. For example, Perl coercion rules cause 12 + "3.14" to evaluate to 15.14. The string literal "3.14" is converted to the numeric value 3.14 before addition is applied. Further, 3.14 is treated as floating point so the result is floating point even though 12 is an integer literal. JavaScript follows different rules so that the same expression evaluates to "123.14" since 12 is converted to a string which is then concatenated with the second operand.

In general, a programmer must be aware of the specific rules regarding operand coercion in order to avoid unexpected and incorrect behavior.

== Examples ==
Mathematical operators

- Arithmetic: such as addition, a + b
- Relational: such as greater than, a > b
- Logic: such as a AND b or a && b
- Assignment: such as a = b or a := b
- Three-way comparison (aka spaceship): x <=> y

Program structure operators

- Record or object field access: such as a.b
- Scope resolution: such as a::b or a.b

Conditional operators

- Ternary conditional: condition ? a : b
- Elvis: x ?: y
- Null coalesing: x ?? y

Notable C and C++ operators

- Address-of operator: &x
- Dereference: *p
- Comma: e, f

Compound operators

- Compound assignment (aka augmented assignment) in C/C++: +=, -=, *=, /=, %=, <<=, >>=, &=, ^=, |=
- Fused: such as cis x = cos x + i sin x

== Operator features in programming languages ==
The following table shows the operator features in several programming languages:

Language	Symbolic operators	Alphanumeric operators	Prefix	Infix	Postfix	Precedence	Associativity	Overloading	User-defined overloading	User-defined symbols
ALGOL 68 each symbolic operator has an alphanumeric equivalent and some a non-ASCII equivalent	+* ** * / % %* %× - + < <= >= > = /= & -:= +:= *:= /:= %:= %*:= +=: :=: :/=: non-ASCII: ¬ +× ⊥ ↑ ↓ ⌊ ⌈ × ÷ ÷× ÷* □ ≤ ≥ ≠ ∧ ∨ ×:= ÷:= ÷×:= ÷*:= %×:= :≠:	not abs arg bin entier leng level odd repr round shorten i shl shr up down lwb upb lt le ge gt eq ne and or over mod elem minusab plusab timesab divab overab modab plusto is isnt	Yes	Yes	No	Yes (prefix operators always have priority 10)	Infix operators are left associative, prefix operators are right associative	Yes	Yes	Yes
APL	+ - × ÷ ⌈ ⌊ * ⍟ | ! ○ ~ ∨ ∧ ⍱ ⍲ < ≤ = ≥ > ≠ . @ ≡ ≢ ⍴ , ⍪ ⍳ ↑ ↓ ? ⍒ ⍋ ⍉ ⌽ ⊖ ∊ ⊥ ⊤ ⍎ ⍕ ⌹ ⊂ ⊃ ∪ ∩ ⍷ ⌷ ∘ → ← / ⌿ \ ⍀ ¨ ⍣ & ⍨ ⌶ ⊆ ⊣ ⊢ ⍠ ⍤ ⌸ ⌺ ⍸	(requires ⎕ prefix)	Yes (first-order functions only)	Yes	Yes (higher-order functions only)	Higher-order functions precede first-order functions	Higher-order functions are left associative, first-order functions are right associative	Yes	Yes	Yes (alphanumeric only)
B	() [] ! ~ ++ -- + - * & / % << >> < <= > >= == != ^ | ?: = =+ =- =* =/ =% =& =^ =| =<< =>> === =|= =< => =<= =>=		Yes	Yes	Yes	Yes	Yes	No	No	No
C	() [] -> . ! ~ ++ -- + - * & / % << >> < <= > >= == != ^ | && || ?: = += -= *= /= %= &= ^= |= <<= >>=	sizeof	Yes	Yes	Yes	Yes	Yes	Yes	No	No
C++	(same as C)	(same as C plus) typeid new delete throw decltype static_cast dynamic cast reinterpret_cast const_cast	Yes	Yes	Yes	Yes	Yes	Yes	Yes	No
C#	(same as C plus) ?. ?[] ?? ??=	sizeof nameof new stackalloc await throw checked unchecked is as delegate default true false LINQ: from select where group...by group...by...into join...in...on...equals join...in...on...equals...into orderby orderby...descending Roslyn-only: __makeref __refvalue __reftype	Yes	Yes	Yes	Yes	Yes	Yes	Yes	No
Java	(same as C)	new throw instanceof	Yes	Yes	Yes	Yes	Yes	Yes	No	No
Eiffel	[] + - * / // = /=	not and or implies "and then" "or else"	Yes	Yes	No	Yes	Yes	No	Yes	Yes
Haskell	+ - * / ^ ^^ ** == /= > < >= <= && || >>= >> $ $! . ++ !! : (and many more)	(function name must be in backticks)	Yes	Yes	No	Yes	Yes	Yes, using Type classes		Yes
mvBasic Databasic/Unibasic	+ - * / ^ ** : = ! & [] += -= := # < > <= >= <> >< =< #> => #<	AND OR NOT EQ NE LT GT LE GE MATCH ADDS() ANDS() CATS() DIVS() EQS() GES() GTS() IFS()	Yes	Yes	Yes	Yes	Yes	Yes	Yes	No
Pascal	* / + - = < > <> <= >= :=	not div mod and or in	Yes	Yes	No	Yes	Yes	Yes	No	No
Perl	-> ++ -- ** ! ~ \ + - . =~ !~ * / % < > <= >= == != <=> ~~ & | ^ && || ' '' // .. ... ?: = += -= *= , =>	print sort chmod chdir rand and or not xor lt gt le ge eq ne cmp x	Yes	Yes	Yes	Yes	Yes	Yes	Yes	No
PHP	[] ** ++ -- ~ @! * / % + - . << >> < <= > >= == != === !== <> <=> & ^ | && || ?? ?: = += -= *= **= /= .= %= &= |= ^= <<= >>=	clone new unset print echo isset instanceof and or xor	Yes	Yes	Yes	Yes	Yes	No	No	No
PL/I	( ) -> + - * / ** > ¬> >= = ¬= <= < ¬< ¬ & | ||		Yes	Yes	No	Yes	Yes	No	No	No
Prolog	:- ?- ; , . =.. = \= < =< >= > == \== - + / *	spy nospy not is mod	Yes	Yes	Yes	Yes	Yes	No	No	Yes
Raku	++ -- ** ! ~ ~~ * / + - . < > <= >= == != <=> & | ^ && || //	print sort chmod chdir rand and or not xor lt gt le ge eq ne leg cmp x xx	Yes	Yes	Yes	Yes	Yes	Yes	Yes	Yes
Rust	() [] . ! + - * & ? / % << >> < <= > >= == != ^ | && || .. ..= = += -= *= /= %= &= ^= |= <<= >>=	&mut&raw const&raw mutas	Yes	Yes	Yes	Yes	Yes	Yes	Yes	No
Smalltalk	(up to two characters)	(alphanumeric symbols need a colon suffix)	No	Yes	Yes	No	No	Yes	Yes	Yes
Swift	(any Unicode symbol string except) . (including) ! ~ + - * / % =+ =- =* =/ =% &+ &- &* =&+ =&- =&* && || << >> & | ^ == != < <= > >= ?? ... ..<	is as as?	Yes	Yes	Yes	Yes (defined as partial order in precedence groups)	Yes (defined as part of precedence groups)	Yes	Yes	Yes
Visual Basic .NET	() . ! ?() ?. ?! + - * / \ & << >> < <= > >= ^ <> = += -= *= /= \= &= ^= <<= >>=	New Await Mod Like Is IsNot Not And AndAlso Or OrElse Xor If(...,...) If(...,...,...) GetXmlNamespace(...) GetType(...) NameOf(...) TypeOf...Is TypeOf...IsNot DirectCast(...,...) TryCast(...,...); LINQ: From Aggregate...Into Select Distinct Where <Order By>...[Ascending|Descending] Take <Take While> Skip <Skip While> Let Group...By...Into Join...On <Group Join...On...Into>	Yes	Yes	Yes	Yes	Yes	Yes	Yes	No
Zig	() [] {} . ! ~ + +% +| - -% -| * *% *| & / % << <<| >> < <= > >= == != ^ | ++ ** .* .? = += +%= +|= -= -%= -|= *= *%= *|= /= %= &= ^= |= <<= <<|= >>=	and or orelse catch	Yes	Yes	Yes	Yes	Yes	Yes	No	No

== See also ==
- Operators in C and C++
