= Static cast =

C++ type conversion operator

In the C++ programming language, static_cast is an operator that performs an explicit type conversion.

== Syntax ==
static_cast<type> (object);

The type parameter must be a data type to which object can be converted via a known method, whether it be a builtin or a cast. The type can be a reference or an enumerator. All types of conversions that are well-defined and allowed by the compiler are performed using static_cast.

The static_cast<> operator can be used for operations such as:

- converting a pointer of a base class to a pointer of a non-virtual derived class (downcasting);
- converting numeric data types such as enums to ints or floats.

Although static_cast conversions are checked at compile time to prevent obvious incompatibilities, no run-time type checking is performed that would prevent a cast between incompatible data types, such as pointers. A static_cast from a pointer to a class B to a pointer to a derived class D is ill-formed if B is an inaccessible or ambiguous base of D. A static_cast from a pointer of a virtual base class (or a base class of a virtual base class) to a pointer of a derived class is ill-formed.

== See also ==
- dynamic_cast
- reinterpret_cast
- const_cast
