= Trailing return type =

C++ alternative syntax for return types

In computer programming, a subroutine (a.k.a. function) will often inform calling code about the result of its computation, by returning a value to that calling code. The data type of that value is called the function's return type.

In the C++ programming language, a function must be declared. The C++ function's return type is specified as a part of declaring that function. A trailing return type, a syntax feature available since C++11, is like a traditional return type, except that it is specified in a different location.

== Syntax ==
An ordinary return type is specified before the function's name. In this example of traditional C++ code, the return type of hasMultipleItems() is bool:

using std::vector;

class MyClass {
private:
    vector<int> items;
public:
    bool hasMultipleItems() {
        return items.size() > 1;
    }
};

A trailing return type is specified after the parameter list, following -> symbols:

using std::vector;

class MyClass {
private:
    vector<int> items;    
public:
    auto hasMultipleItems() -> bool {
        return items.size() > 1;
    }
};

== Distinction from other language features ==
In modern C++, the meaning of the auto keyword will depend on its context:

- When used in a variable's definition (e.g., auto x = 11;), the auto keyword indicates type inference. The data type for that x will be deduced from its initialization. Starting with C++14, the return type of a function can also be inferred by using auto without specifying a trailing return type. For example:

auto hasMultipleItems() {
    return items.size() > 1;
}

- On the other hand, there is no type inference in the hasMultipleItems() example on the previous section. That example only uses the auto keyword as a syntactic element, because a trailing return type is being used.

== Rationale ==
Consider the task of programming a generic version of the following:

int add(const int& lhs, const int& rhs) { 
    return lhs + rhs; 
}

A proper expression of this function's return type would use the two formal parameter names with decltype: decltype(lhs + rhs). However, where a return type is traditionally specified, those two formal parameters are not yet in scope.

Consequently, this code will not compile:

// This will not compile
template <typename L, typename R>
decltype(lhs + rhs) add(const L& lhs, const R& rhs) {
    return lhs + rhs;
}

However, where a trailing return type is specified, the formal parameters are in scope:

template <typename L, typename R>
auto add(const L& lhs, const R& rhs) -> decltype(lhs + rhs) {
    return lhs + rhs;
}

== See also ==
- Language enhancements of C++ 11
