= Type punning =

Technique circumventing programming language data typing

In computer science, type punning is any programming technique that subverts or circumvents the type system of a programming language in order to achieve an effect that would be difficult or impossible to achieve within the bounds of the formal language.

In C and C++, constructs such as pointer type conversion and union — C++ adds reference type conversion and reinterpret_cast to this list — are provided in order to permit many kinds of type punning, although some kinds are not actually supported by the standard language.

In the Pascal programming language, the use of records with variants may be used to treat a particular data type in more than one manner, or in a manner not normally permitted.

== Sockets example ==
One classic example of type punning is found in the Berkeley sockets interface. The function to bind an opened but uninitialized socket to an IP address is declared as follows:

int bind(int sockfd, struct sockaddr *my_addr, socklen_t addrlen);

The bind function is usually called as follows:

#include <sys/socket.h>

struct sockaddr_in sa = {
    .sin_family = AF_INET,
    .sin_port = htons(port)
};

int sockfd = socket(PF_INET, SOCK_STREAM, IPPROTO_TCP);
bind(sockfd, (struct sockaddr*)&sa, sizeof sa);

The Berkeley sockets library fundamentally relies on the fact that in C, a pointer to struct sockaddr_in is freely convertible to a pointer to struct sockaddr; and, in addition, that the two structure types share the same memory layout. Therefore, a reference to the structure field my_addr->sin_family (where my_addr is of type struct sockaddr*) will actually refer to the field sa.sin_family (where sa is of type struct sockaddr_in). In other words, the sockets library uses type punning to implement a rudimentary form of polymorphism or inheritance.

Often seen in the programming world is the use of "padded" data structures to allow for the storage of different kinds of values in what is effectively the same storage space. This is often seen when two structures are used in mutual exclusivity for optimization.

== Floating-point example ==
Not all examples of type punning involve structures, as the previous example did. Suppose we want to determine whether a floating-point number is negative. We could write:

bool is_negative(float x) {
    return x < 0.0f;
}

However, supposing that floating-point comparisons are expensive, and also supposing that float is represented according to the IEEE floating-point standard, and integers are 32 bits wide, we could engage in type punning to extract the sign bit of the floating-point number using only integer operations:

bool is_negative(float x) {
    int* i = (int*)&x;
    return *i < 0;
}

Note that the behaviour will not be exactly the same: in the special case of x being negative zero, the first implementation yields false while the second yields true. Also, the first implementation will return false for any NaN value, but the latter might return true for NaN values with the sign bit set. Lastly we have the problem wherein the storage of the floating point data may be in big endian or little endian memory order and thus the sign bit could be in the least significant byte or the most significant byte. Therefore the use of type punning with floating point data is a questionable method with unpredictable results.

This kind of type punning is more dangerous than most. Whereas the sockets example relied only on guarantees made by the C programming language about structure layout and pointer convertibility, the float example relies on assumptions about a particular system's hardware. The C99 Language Specification ( ISO9899:1999 ) has the following warning in section 6.3.2.3 Pointers : "A pointer to an object or incomplete type may be converted to a pointer to a different object or incomplete type. If the resulting pointer is not correctly aligned for the pointed-to type, the behavior is undefined." Therefore one should be very careful with the use of type punning.

Some situations, such as time-critical code that the compiler otherwise fails to optimize, may require dangerous code. In these cases, documenting all such assumptions in comments, and introducing static assertions to verify portability expectations, helps to keep the code maintainable.

Practical examples of floating-point punning include fast inverse square root popularized by Quake III, fast FP comparison as integers, and finding neighboring values by incrementing as an integer (implementing nextafter).

== By language ==
=== C and C++ ===
In addition to the assumption about bit-representation of floating-point numbers, the above floating-point type-punning example also violates the C language's constraints on how objects are accessed: the declared type of x is float but it is read through an expression of type unsigned int. On many common platforms, this use of pointer punning can create problems if different pointers are aligned in machine-specific ways. Furthermore, pointers of different sizes can alias accesses to the same memory, causing problems that are unchecked by the compiler. Even when data size and pointer representation match, however, compilers can rely on the non-aliasing constraints to perform optimizations that would be unsafe in the presence of disallowed aliasing.

==== Use of pointers ====
A naive attempt at type-punning can be achieved by using pointers: (The following running example assumes IEEE-754 bit-representation for type float.)

// in C
bool is_negative(float x) {
    int32_t i = *(int32_t*)&x;
    return i < 0;
}

// in C++
bool is_negative(float x) {
    int32_t i = *reinterpret_cast<int32_t*>(&x);
    return i < 0;
}

The C standard's aliasing rules state that an object shall have its stored value accessed only by an lvalue expression of a compatible type. The types float and int32_t are not compatible, therefore this code's behavior is undefined. Although on GCC and LLVM this particular program compiles and runs as expected, more complicated examples may interact with assumptions made by strict aliasing and lead to unwanted behavior. The option -fno-strict-aliasing will ensure correct behavior of code using this form of type-punning, although using other forms of type punning is recommended.

==== Use of union ====
In C, but not in C++, it is sometimes possible to perform type punning via a union.

bool is_negative(float x) {
    union {
        int i;
        float f;
    } my_union;
    my_union.f = x;
    return my_union.i < 0;
}

Accessing my_union.i after most recently writing to the other member, my_union.f, is an allowed form of type-punning in C, provided that the member read is not larger than the one whose value was set (otherwise the read has unspecified behavior). The same is syntactically valid but has undefined behavior in C++, where only the last-written member of a union is considered to have any value at all.

For another example of type punning, see Stride of an array.

==== Use of memcpy ====
memcpy is a safe and portable method of type punning, blessed in the C++ standard. Clang and GCC include specific optimizations for memcpy calls of this sort.

#include <string.h>

bool is_negative(float x) {
    int i;
    memcpy(&i, &x, sizeof(int)); // or std::memcpy in C++
    return i < 0;
}

==== Use of bit_cast ====
In C++20, the std::bit_cast function allows type punning with no undefined behavior. It also allows the function be labeled constexpr. The reference implementation is a wrapper around std::memcpy.

import std;

using std::numeric_limits;

constexpr bool is_negative(float x) noexcept {
   static_assert(numeric_limits<float>::is_iec559); // (enable only on IEEE 754)
   int32_t i = std::bit_cast<int32_t>(x);
   return i < 0 ;
}

Another type punning mechanism included to C++ in C++23 with std::start_lifetime_as and std::start_lifetime_as_array.

=== Pascal ===
A variant record permits treating a data type as multiple kinds of data depending on which variant is being referenced. In the following example, integer is presumed to be 16 bit, while longint and real are presumed to be 32, while character is presumed to be 8 bit:

type
    VariantRecord = record
        case RecType : LongInt of
            1: (I : array[1..2] of Integer);  (* not show here: there can be several variables in a variant record's case statement *)
            2: (L : LongInt               );
            3: (R : Real                  );
            4: (C : array[1..4] of Char   );
        end;

var
    V  : VariantRecord;
    K  : Integer;
    LA : LongInt;
    RA : Real;
    Ch : Character;

V.I[1] := 1;
Ch     := V.C[1];  (* this would extract the first byte of V.I *)
V.R    := 8.3;   
LA     := V.L;     (* this would store a Real into an Integer *)

In Pascal, copying a real to an integer converts it to the truncated value. This method would translate the binary value of the floating-point number into whatever it is as a long integer (32 bit), which will not be the same and may be incompatible with the long integer value on some systems.

These examples could be used to create strange conversions, although, in some cases, there may be legitimate uses for these types of constructs, such as for determining locations of particular pieces of data. In the following example a pointer and a longint are both presumed to be 32 bit:

type
    PA = ^Arec;

    Arec = record
        case RT : LongInt of
            1: (P : PA     );
            2: (L : LongInt);
        end;

var
    PP : PA;
    K  : LongInt;

New(PP);
PP^.P := PP;
WriteLn('Variable PP is located at address ', Hex(PP^.L));

Where "new" is the standard routine in Pascal for allocating memory for a pointer, and "hex" is presumably a routine to print the hexadecimal string describing the value of an integer. This would allow the display of the address of a pointer, something which is not normally permitted. (Pointers cannot be read or written, only assigned.) Assigning a value to an integer variant of a pointer would allow examining or writing to any location in system memory:

PP^.L := 0;
PP    := PP^.P;  (* PP now points to address 0     *)
K     := PP^.L;  (* K contains the value of word 0 *)
WriteLn('Word 0 of this machine contains ', K);

This construct may cause a program check or protection violation if address 0 is protected against reading on the machine the program is running upon or the operating system it is running under.

The reinterpret cast technique from C/C++ also works in Pascal. This can be useful, when eg. reading dwords from a byte stream, and we want to treat them as float. Here is a working example, where we reinterpret-cast a dword to a float:

type
    pReal = ^Real;

var
    DW : DWord;
    F  : Real;

F := pReal(@DW)^;

=== C# ===
In C# (and other .NET languages), type punning is a little harder to achieve because of the type system, but can be done nonetheless, using pointers or struct unions.

==== Pointers ====
C# only allows pointers to so-called native types, i.e. any primitive type (except string), enum, array or struct that is composed only of other native types. Note that pointers are only allowed in code blocks marked 'unsafe'.

unsafe
{
    float pi = 3.14159;
    uint piAsRawData = *(uint*)&pi;
}

==== Struct unions ====
Struct unions are allowed without any notion of 'unsafe' code, but they do require the definition of a new type.

[StructLayout(LayoutKind.Explicit)]
struct FloatAndUIntUnion
{
    [FieldOffset(0)]
    public float DataAsFloat;

    [FieldOffset(0)]
    public uint DataAsUInt;
}

// ...

FloatAndUIntUnion union;
union.DataAsFloat = 3.14159;
uint piAsRawData = union.DataAsUInt;

==== Raw CIL code ====
Raw CIL can be used instead of C#, because it doesn't have most of the type limitations. This allows one to, for example, combine two enum values of a generic type:

TEnum a = ...;
TEnum b = ...;
TEnum combined = a | b; // illegal

This can be circumvented by the following CIL code:

.method public static hidebysig
    !!TEnum CombineEnums<valuetype .ctor ([mscorlib]System.ValueType) TEnum>(
        !!TEnum a,
        !!TEnum b
    ) cil managed
{
    .maxstack 2

    ldarg.0 
    ldarg.1
    or  // this will not cause an overflow, because a and b have the same type, and therefore the same size.
    ret
}

The cpblk CIL opcode allows for some other tricks, such as converting a struct to a byte array:

.method public static hidebysig
    uint8[] ToByteArray<valuetype .ctor ([mscorlib]System.ValueType) T>(
        !!T& v // 'ref T' in C#
    ) cil managed
{
    .locals init (
        [0] uint8[]
    )

    .maxstack 3

    // create a new byte array with length sizeof(T) and store it in local 0
    sizeof !!T
    newarr uint8
    dup           // keep a copy on the stack for later (1)
    stloc.0

    ldc.i4.0
    ldelema uint8

    // memcpy(local 0, &v, sizeof(T));
    // <the array is still on the stack, see (1)>
    ldarg.0 // this is the *address* of 'v', because its type is '!!T&'
    sizeof !!T
    cpblk

    ldloc.0
    ret
}

=== Java ===
Unlike C/C++ which offer memory access and pointer arithmetic, Java does not (officially) support these. However, type punning can be similarly simulated.

==== Using java.nio.ByteBuffer ====
import java.nio.ByteBuffer;

void main(String[] args) {
    int value = 42;

    ByteBuffer buffer = ByteBuffer.allocate(Integer.BYTES);
    buffer.putInt(value);

    // "Pun" this data into a float (just as an example)
    buffer.flip();
    float punResult = buffer.getFloat();
}

==== Using sun.misc.Unsafe ====
Using sun.misc.Unsafe, type punning can be done directly, using direct memory access.

import java.lang.reflect.Field;
import sun.misc.Unsafe;

void main(String[] args) throws NoSuchFieldException, IllegalAccessException {
     Field f = Unsafe.class.getDeclaredField("theUnsafe");
     f.setAccessible(true);
     Unsafe unsafe = (Unsafe) f.get(null);

     long address = unsafe.allocateMemory(4);
     unsafe.putInt(address, 42);

     // Interpret the memory location as a float
     float result = unsafe.getFloat(address);
        
     unsafe.freeMemory(address);
}
