= Type introspection =

Programming language feature

In computing, type introspection is the ability of a program to examine the type or properties of an object at runtime. Some programming languages possess this capability.

Introspection should not be confused with reflection, which goes a step further and is the ability for a program to manipulate the metadata, properties, and functions of an object at runtime. Some programming languages also possess that capability (e.g., Java, Python, Julia, and Go).

== Examples ==
=== ActionScript ===
In ActionScript (as3), the function flash.utils.getQualifiedClassName can be used to retrieve the class/type name of an arbitrary object.

// all classes used in as3 must be imported explicitly
import flash.display.Sprite;
import flash.utils.getQualifiedClassName;

// trace is like System.out.println() in Java or echo in PHP
trace(getQualifiedClassName("I'm a String")); // "String"
trace(getQualifiedClassName(1)); // "int", see dynamic casting for why not Number
trace(getQualifiedClassName(new Sprite())); // "flash.display.Sprite"

Alternatively, the operator is can be used to determine if an object is of a specific type:

// trace is like System.out.println() in Java or echo in PHP
trace("I'm a String" is String); // true
trace(1 is String); // false
trace("I'm a String" is Number); // false
trace(1 is Number); // true

This second function can be used to test class inheritance parents as well:

import flash.display.DisplayObject;
import flash.display.Sprite; // extends DisplayObject

trace(new Sprite() is Sprite); // true
trace(new Sprite() is DisplayObject); // true, because Sprite extends DisplayObject
trace(new Sprite() is String); // false

==== Meta-type introspection ====
Like Perl, ActionScript can go further than getting the class name, but all the metadata, functions and other elements that make up an object using the flash.utils.describeType function; this is used when implementing reflection in ActionScript.

import flash.display.Sprite;
import flash.utils.describeType;
import flash.utils.getDefinitionByName;
import flash.utils.getQualifiedClassName;

var className: String = getQualifiedClassName(new Sprite()); // "flash.display.Sprite"
var classRef: Class = getDefinitionByName(className); // Class reference to flash.display.Sprite
// eg. 'new classRef()' same as 'new flash.display.Sprite()'
trace(describeType(classRef)); // return XML object describing type
// same as : trace(describeType(flash.display.Sprite));

=== Assemblers ===
Some macro assemblers, e.g., the line from IBM Assembler F to IBM High Level Assembler (HLASM), allow a macro definition to examine the attributes of a symbol. This is a type of compile-time introspection.

=== C++ ===
C++ supports type introspection via the run-time type information (RTTI) typeid and dynamic_cast keywords. The dynamic_cast expression can be used to determine whether a particular object is of a particular derived class. For instance:

Person* p = dynamic_cast<Person*>(obj);
if (p) {
    p->walk();
}

The typeid operator retrieves a std::type_info object describing the most derived type of an object:

if (typeid(*obj) == typeid(Person)) {
    serializePerson(obj);
}

Using C++26's reflection, an object can be reflected with the ^^ operator (which produces a std::meta::info value, a mirror). This can then be checked against std::meta::type_of(), which returns the underlying type handle of a std::meta::info.

if (std::meta::type_of(^^obj) == ^^Person) {
    serializePerson(obj);
}

=== C# ===
In C# introspection can be done using the is keyword. For instance:

if (obj is Person)
{
    // ...
}

=== Objective-C ===
In Objective-C, for example, both the generic Object and NSObject (in Cocoa/OpenStep) provide the method isMemberOfClass: which returns true if the argument to the method is an instance of the specified class. The method isKindOfClass: analogously returns true if the argument inherits from the specified class.

For example, say we have an Apple and an Orange class inheriting from Fruit.

Now, in the eat method we can write

- (void)eat:(id)sth {
    if ([sth isKindOfClass:[Fruit class]]) {
        // we're actually eating a Fruit, so continue
        if ([sth isMemberOfClass:[Apple class]]) {
            eatApple(sth);
        } else if ([sth isMemberOfClass:[Orange class]]) {
            eatOrange(sth);
        } else {
            error();
        }
    } else {
        error();
    }
}

Now, when eat is called with a generic object (an id), the function will behave correctly depending on the type of the generic object.

=== Object Pascal ===
Type introspection has been a part of Object Pascal since the original release of Delphi, which uses RTTI heavily for visual form design. In Object Pascal, all classes descend from the base TObject class, which implements basic RTTI functionality. Every class's name can be referenced in code for RTTI purposes; the class name identifier is implemented as a pointer to the class's metadata, which can be declared and used as a variable of type TClass. The language includes an is operator, to determine if an object is or descends from a given class, an as operator, providing a type-checked typecast, and several TObject methods. Deeper introspection (enumerating fields and methods) is traditionally only supported for objects declared in the $M+ (a pragma) state, typically TPersistent, and only for symbols defined in the published section. Delphi 2010 increased this to nearly all symbols.

procedure Form1.MyButtonOnClick(Sender: TObject);
var
   aButton: TButton;
   SenderClass: TClass;
begin
   SenderClass := Sender.ClassType; //returns Sender's class pointer
   if sender is TButton then
   begin
      aButton := sender as TButton;
      EditBox.Text := aButton.Caption; //Property that the button has but generic objects don't
   end
   else begin
      EditBox.Text := Sender.ClassName; //returns the name of Sender's class as a string
   end;
end;

=== Java ===
The simplest example of type introspection in Java is the instanceof operator. The instanceof operator determines whether a particular object belongs to a particular class (or a subclass of that class, or a class that implements that interface). For instance:

if (obj instanceof Person p) {
    p.walk();
}

The java.lang.Class class is the basis of more advanced introspection.

For instance, if it is desirable to determine the actual class of an object (rather than whether it is a member of a particular class), Object.getClass() and Class.getName() can be used:

System.out.println(obj.getClass().getName());

=== PHP ===
In PHP introspection can be done using instanceof operator. For instance:

if ($obj instanceof Person) {
    // Do whatever you want
}

=== Perl ===
Introspection can be achieved using the ref and isa functions in Perl.

We can introspect the following classes and their corresponding instances:

package Animal;
sub new {
    my $class = shift;
    return bless {}, $class;
}

package Dog;
use base 'Animal';

package main;
my $animal = Animal->new();
my $dog = Dog->new();

using:

print "This is an Animal.\n" if ref $animal eq 'Animal';
print "Dog is an Animal.\n" if $dog->isa('Animal');

==== Meta-Object Protocol ====
Much more powerful introspection in Perl can be achieved using the Moose object system and the Class::MOP meta-object protocol; for example, you can check if a given object does a role X:

if ($object->meta->does_role("X")) {
    # do something ...
}

This is how you can list fully qualified names of all of the methods that can be invoked on the object, together with the classes in which they were defined:

for my $method ($object->meta->get_all_methods) {
    print $method->fully_qualified_name, "\n";
}

=== Python ===
The most common method of introspection in Python is using the dir function to detail the attributes of an object. For example:

class Foo:
    def __init__(self, val: int) -> None:
        self.x = val

    def get_x(self) -> int:
        return self.x

print(dir(Foo(5)))
# prints ['__class__', '__delattr__', '__dict__', '__dir__', '__doc__', '__eq__', '__firstlineno__', '__format__', '__ge__', '__getattribute__', '__getstate__', '__gt__', '__hash__', '__init__', '__init_subclass__', '__le__', '__lt__', '__module__', '__ne__', '__new__', '__reduce__', '__reduce_ex__', '__repr__', '__setattr__', '__sizeof__', '__static_attributes__', '__str__', '__subclasshook__', '__weakref__', 'get_x', 'x']

Also, the built-in functions type and isinstance can be used to determine what an object is while hasattr can determine what an object does. For example:

a: Foo = Foo(10)
b: Bar = Bar(11)
print(type(a))
# prints <type 'Foo'>
isinstance(a, Foo)
# prints True
print(isinstance(a, type(a)))
# prints True
print(isinstance(a, type(b)))
# prints False
print(hasattr(a, 'bar'))
# prints True

Further, Python type hints can be accessed at runtime and can be used by libraries such as Pydantic for serialization and validation, and FastAPI for dependency injection and API schema generation.

=== Ruby ===
Type introspection is a core feature of Ruby. In Ruby, the Object class (ancestor of every class) provides Object#instance_of? and Object#kind_of? methods for checking the instance's class. The latter returns true when the particular instance the message was sent to is an instance of a descendant of the class in question. For example, consider the following example code (you can immediately try this with the Interactive Ruby Shell):

$ irb
irb(main):001:0> A=Class.new
=> A
irb(main):002:0> B=Class.new A
=> B
irb(main):003:0> a=A.new
=> #<A:0x2e44b78>
irb(main):004:0> b=B.new
=> #<B:0x2e431b0>
irb(main):005:0> a.instance_of? A
=> true
irb(main):006:0> b.instance_of? A
=> false
irb(main):007:0> b.kind_of? A
=> true

In the example above, the Class class is used as any other class in Ruby. Two classes are created, A and B, the former is being a superclass of the latter, then one instance of each class is checked. The last expression gives true because A is a superclass of the class of b.

Further, you can directly ask for the class of any object, and "compare" them (code below assumes having executed the code above):

irb(main):008:0> A.instance_of? Class
=> true
irb(main):009:0> a.class
=> A
irb(main):010:0> a.class.class
=> Class
irb(main):011:0> A > B
=> true
irb(main):012:0> B <= A
=> true

=== Rust ===
In Rust, there is a nightly API std::mem::type_info that provides compile-time type introspection. std::any::TypeId and std::mem::type_info::Type are a sort of mirror, allowing for limited compile-time reflection.

#![feature(type_info)]

use std::any::TypeId;
use std::mem::type_info::{Type, TypeKind};

struct User {
    id: u32,
    username: &'static str,
    is_active: bool,
}

fn main() {
    let info: Type = Type::of::<User>();

    match info.kind {
        TypeKind::Struct(struct_info) => {
            println!("Inspecting Struct fields:");
            for field in struct_info.fields {
                println!(
                    " - Field Name: '{}' | Byte Offset: {} bytes", 
                    field.name,
                    field.offset
                );
            }
        }
        TypeKind::Enum(_enum_info) => {
            println!("This type is an Enum");
        }
        _ => {
            println!("This is a primitive, tuple, or alternative type layout.");
        }
    }
}

== See also ==
- Reification (computer science)
- Reflective programming
- typeof
