= Information space analysis =

Machine intelligence method

Within the field of information science, information space analysis is a deterministic method, enhanced by machine intelligence, for locating and assessing resources for team-centric efforts.

Organizations need to be able to quickly assemble teams backed by the support services, information, and material to do the job. To do so, these teams need to find and assess sources of services that are potential participants in the team effort. To support this initial team and resource development, information needs to be developed via analysis tools that help make sense of sets of data sources in an Intranet or Internet. Part of the process is to characterize them, partition them, and sort and filter them.

These tools focus on three key issues in forming a collaborative team:

1. Help individuals responsible for forming the team understand what is available.
2. Assist team members in identifying the structure and categorize the information available to them in a manner specifically suited to the task at hand.
3. Aid team members to understand the mappings of their information between their organization and that used by others who might participate.

Information space analysis tools combine multiple methods to assist in this task. This causes the tools to be particularly well-suited to integrating additional technologies in order to create specialized systems.
