= Syntax (programming languages) =

Form of source code, without regard to meaning

This Python code is shown with coloring that highlights syntactic aspects.

The syntax of computer source code is code structured and ordered restricted to computer language rules. Like a natural language, a computer language (i.e. a programming language) defines the syntax that is valid for that language. A syntax error occurs when syntactically invalid source code is processed by a tool such as a compiler or interpreter.

The most commonly used languages are text-based with syntax based on strings. Alternatively, the syntax of a visual programming language is based on relationships between graphical elements.

When designing syntax, a designer of any language might start by writing down examples of both legal and illegal strings, before trying to figure out the general rules from those examples in use. Such that its general structure of syntax can be determined through its form of composition, so to yield semantically valid ranges everytime for each possible alteration. Or else, it returns errors, and warnings, for each invalid input.

== Levels of syntax ==
Computer language syntax is generally distinguished into three levels:

- Words – the lexical level, determining how characters form tokens;
- Phrases – the grammar level, narrowly speaking, determining how tokens form phrases;
- Context – determining what objects or variables names' refer to, if types are valid, etc.

Distinguishing in this way yields modularity, allowing each level to be described and processed separately and often independently.

First, a lexer turns the linear sequence of characters into a linear sequence of tokens; this is known as "lexical analysis" or "lexing".

Second, the parser turns the linear sequence of tokens into a hierarchical syntax tree; this is known as "parsing" narrowly speaking. This ensures that the line of tokens conform to the formal grammars of the programming language. The parsing stage itself can be divided into two parts: the parse tree, or "concrete syntax tree", which is determined by the grammar, but is generally far too detailed for practical use, and the abstract syntax tree (AST), which simplifies this into a usable form. The AST and contextual analysis steps can be considered a form of semantic analysis, as they are adding meaning and interpretation to the syntax, or alternatively as informal, manual implementations of syntactical rules that would be difficult or awkward to describe or implement formally.

Thirdly, the contextual analysis resolves names and checks types. This modularity is sometimes possible, but in many real-world languages an earlier step depends on a later step – for example, the lexer hack in C is because tokenization depends on context. Even in these cases, syntactical analysis is often seen as approximating this ideal model.

The levels generally correspond to levels in the Chomsky hierarchy. Words are in a regular language, specified in the lexical grammar, which is a Type-3 grammar, generally given as regular expressions. Phrases are in a context-free language (CFL), generally a deterministic context-free language (DCFL), specified in a phrase structure grammar, which is a Type-2 grammar, generally given as production rules in Backus–Naur form (BNF). Phrase grammars are often specified in much more constrained grammars than full context-free grammars, in order to make them easier to parse; while the LR parser can parse any DCFL in linear time, the simple LALR parser and even simpler LL parser are more efficient, but can only parse grammars which production rules are constrained. In principle, contextual structure can be described by a context-sensitive grammar, and automatically analyzed by means such as attribute grammars, though, in general, this step is done manually, via name resolution rules and type checking, and implemented via a symbol table which stores names and types for each scope.

Tools have been written that automatically generate a lexer from a lexical specification written in regular expressions and a parser from the phrase grammar written in BNF: this allows one to use declarative programming, rather than need to have procedural or functional programming. A notable example is the lex-yacc pair. These automatically produce a concrete syntax tree; the parser writer must then manually write code describing how this is converted to an abstract syntax tree. Contextual analysis is also generally implemented manually. Despite the existence of these automatic tools, parsing is often implemented manually, for various reasons – perhaps the phrase structure is not context-free, or an alternative implementation improves performance or error-reporting, or allows the grammar to be changed more easily. Parsers are often written in functional programming languages, such as Haskell, or in scripting languages, such as Python or Perl, or in imperative programming languages such as C or C++.

== Syntax definition ==
Parse tree of Python code with inset tokenization

The syntax of textual programming languages is usually defined using a combination of regular expressions (for lexical structure) and Backus–Naur form (a metalanguage for grammatical structure) to inductively specify syntactic categories (nonterminal) and terminal symbols. Syntactic categories are defined by rules called productions, which specify the values that belong to a particular syntactic category. Terminal symbols are the concrete characters or strings of characters (for example keywords such as define, if, let, or void) from which syntactically valid programs are constructed.

Syntax can be divided into context-free syntax and context-sensitive syntax. Context-free syntax are rules directed by the metalanguage of the programming language. These would not be constrained by the context surrounding or referring that part of the syntax, whereas context-sensitive syntax would.

A language can have different equivalent grammars, such as equivalent regular expressions (at the lexical levels), or different phrase rules which generate the same language. Using a broader category of grammars, such as LR grammars, can allow shorter or simpler grammars compared with more restricted categories, such as LL grammar, which may require longer grammars with more rules. Different but equivalent phrase grammars yield different parse trees, though the underlying language (set of valid documents) is the same.

=== Example: Lisp S-expressions ===
Below is a simple grammar, defined using the notation of regular expressions and Extended Backus–Naur form. It describes the syntax of S-expressions, a data syntax of the programming language Lisp, which defines productions for the syntactic categories expression, atom, number, symbol, and list:

expression = atom   | list
atom       = number | symbol    
number     = [+-]?['0'-'9']+
symbol     = ['A'-'Z']['A'-'Z''0'-'9'].*
list       = '(', expression*, ')'

This grammar specifies the following:

- an expression is either an atom or a list;
- an atom is either a number or a symbol;
- a number is an unbroken sequence of one or more decimal digits, optionally preceded by a plus or minus sign;
- a symbol is a letter followed by zero or more of any characters (excluding whitespace); and
- a list is a matched pair of parentheses, with zero or more expressions inside it.

Here the decimal digits, upper- and lower-case characters, and parentheses are terminal symbols.

The following are examples of well-formed token sequences in this grammar: '12345', '()', '(A B C232 (1))'

=== Complex grammars ===
The grammar needed to specify a programming language can be classified by its position in the Chomsky hierarchy. The phrase grammar of most programming languages can be specified using a Type-2 grammar, i.e., they are context-free grammars, though the overall syntax is context-sensitive (due to variable declarations and nested scopes), hence Type-1. However, there are exceptions, and for some languages the phrase grammar is Type-0 (Turing-complete).

In some languages like Perl and Lisp the specification (or implementation) of the language allows constructs that execute during the parsing phase. Furthermore, these languages have constructs that allow the programmer to alter the behavior of the parser. This combination effectively blurs the distinction between parsing and execution, and makes syntax analysis an undecidable problem in these languages, meaning that the parsing phase may not finish. For example, in Perl it is possible to execute code during parsing using a BEGIN statement, and Perl function prototypes may alter the syntactic interpretation, and possibly even the syntactic validity of the remaining code. Colloquially this is referred to as "only Perl can parse Perl" (because code must be executed during parsing, and can modify the grammar), or more strongly "even Perl cannot parse Perl" (because it is undecidable). Similarly, Lisp macros introduced by the defmacro syntax also execute during parsing, meaning that a Lisp compiler must have an entire Lisp run-time system present. In contrast, C macros are merely string replacements, and do not require code execution.

== Syntax versus semantics ==
The syntax of a language describes the form of a valid program, but does not provide any information about the meaning of the program or the results of executing that program. The meaning given to a combination of symbols is handled by semantics (either formal or hard-coded in a reference implementation). Valid syntax must be established before semantics can make meaning out of it. Not all syntactically correct programs are semantically correct. Many syntactically correct programs are nonetheless ill-formed, per the language's rules; and may (depending on the language specification and the soundness of the implementation) result in an error on translation or execution. In some cases, such programs may exhibit undefined behavior. Even when a program is well-defined within a language, it may still have a meaning that is not intended by the person who wrote it.

Using natural language as an example, it may not be possible to assign a meaning to a grammatically correct sentence or the sentence may be false:

- "Colorless green ideas sleep furiously." is grammatically well formed but has no generally accepted meaning.
- "John is a married bachelor." is grammatically well formed but expresses a meaning that cannot be true.

The following C language fragment is syntactically correct, but performs an operation that is not semantically defined (because p is a null pointer, the operations p->real and p->im have no meaning):

 complex *p = NULL;
 complex abs_p = sqrt (p->real * p->real + p->im * p->im);

As a simpler example,

 int x;
 printf("%d", x);

is syntactically valid, but not semantically defined, as it uses an uninitialized variable. Even though compilers for some programming languages (e.g., Java and C#) would detect uninitialized variable errors of this kind, they should be regarded as semantic errors rather than syntax errors.

== See also ==
- Abstract syntax tree
- Language construct
- Comparison of programming languages (syntax)
    - C
    - C++
    - Java
    - JavaScript
    - Haskell
    - Lua
    - Perl
    - PHP
    - Prolog
    - python
- Naming convention (programming)
- "Hello, World!" program
