= Iterative and incremental development =

Development methodology

Iterative and incremental development is any combination of both iterative design (or iterative method) and incremental build model for development.

Usage of the term began in software development, with a long-standing combination of the two terms iterative and incremental having been widely suggested for large development efforts. For example, the 1985 DOD-STD-2167 mentions (in section 4.1.2): "During software development, more than one iteration of the software development cycle may be in progress at the same time." and "This process may be described as an 'evolutionary acquisition' or 'incremental build' approach." In software, the relationship between iterations and increments is determined by the overall software development process.

Iterative development model

== Overview ==
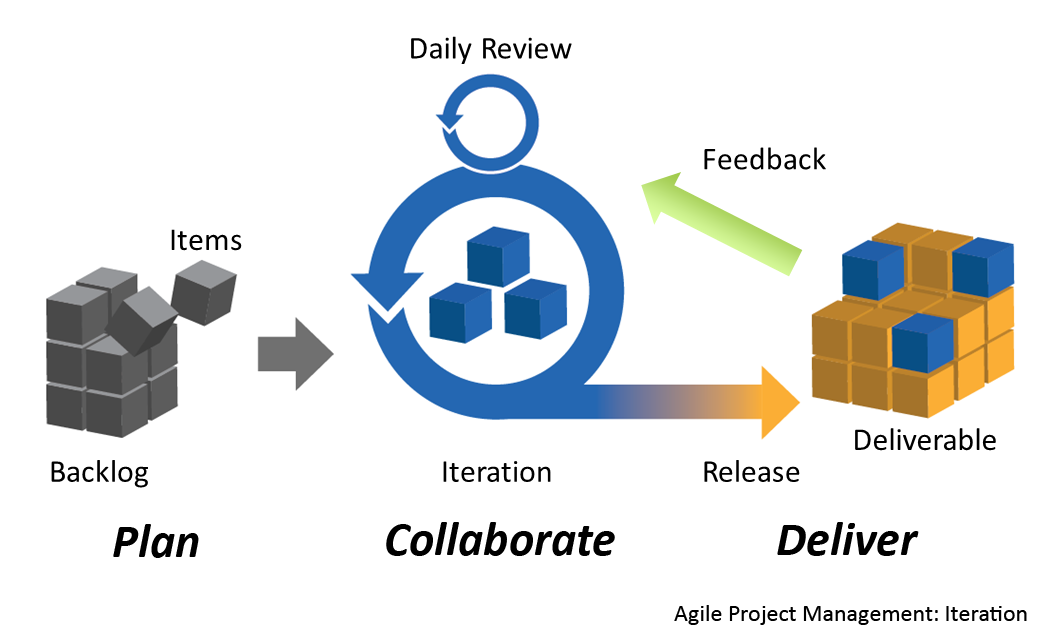
A simplified version of a typical iteration cycle in agile project management

The basic idea behind this method is to develop a system through repeated cycles (iterative) and in smaller portions at a time (incremental), allowing software developers to take advantage of what was learned during development of earlier parts or versions of the system. Learning comes from both the development and use of the system, where possible key steps in the process start with a simple implementation of a subset of the software requirements and iteratively enhance the evolving versions until the full system is implemented. At each iteration, design modifications are made and new functional capabilities are added.

The procedure itself consists of the initialization step, the iteration step, and the Project Control List. The initialization step creates a base version of the system. The goal for this initial implementation is to create a product to which the user can react. It should offer a sampling of the key aspects of the problem and provide a solution that is simple enough to understand and implement easily. To guide the iteration process, a project control list is created that contains a record of all tasks that need to be performed. It includes items such as new features to be implemented and areas of redesign of the existing solution. The control list is constantly being revised as a result of the analysis phase.

An iteration involves redesign and implementation, which is meant to be simple, straightforward, and modular, supporting redesign at that stage or as a future task added to the project control list. The level of design detail is not dictated by the iterative approach. In a light-weight iterative project the code may represent the major source of documentation of the system; however, in a critical iterative project a formal Software Design Document may be used. The analysis of an iteration is based upon user feedback and the program analysis facilities available. It involves analysis of the structure, modularity, usability, reliability, efficiency, and achievement of goals. The project control list is modified in light of the analysis results.

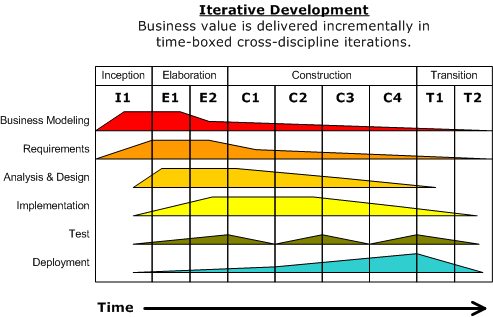
Iterative development

=== Phases ===
Incremental development slices the system functionality into increments (portions). In each increment, a slice of functionality is delivered through cross-discipline work, from the requirements to the deployment. The Unified Process groups increments/iterations into phases: inception, elaboration, construction, and transition.

- Inception identifies project scope, requirements (functional and non-functional) and risks at a high level but in enough detail that work can be estimated.
- Elaboration delivers a working architecture that mitigates the top risks and fulfills the non-functional requirements.
- Construction incrementally fills-in the architecture with production-ready code produced from analysis, design, implementation, and testing of the functional requirements.
- Transition delivers the system into the production operating environment.

Each of the phases may be divided into 1 or more iterations, which are usually time-boxed rather than feature-boxed. Architects and analysts work one iteration ahead of developers and testers to keep their work-product backlog full.

=== Usage and history ===
Many examples of early usage are provided in Craig Larman and Victor Basili's article "Iterative and Incremental Development: A Brief History", with one of the earliest being NASA's 1960s Project Mercury.

Some of those Mercury engineers later formed a new division within IBM, where "another early and striking example of a major IID success [was] the very heart of NASA’s space shuttle software—the primary avionics software system, which [they] built from 1977 to 1980. The team applied IID in a series of 17 iterations over 31 months, averaging around eight weeks per iteration. Their motivation for avoiding the waterfall life cycle was that the shuttle program’s requirements changed during the software development process."

Some organizations, such as the US Department of Defense, have a preference for iterative methodologies, starting with MIL-STD-498 "clearly encouraging evolutionary acquisition and IID".

The DoD Instruction 5000.2 released in 2000 stated a clear preference for IID:

There are two approaches, evolutionary and single step [waterfall], to full capability. An evolutionary approach is preferred. … [In this] approach, the ultimate capability delivered to the user is divided into two or more blocks, with increasing increments of capability...software development shall follow an iterative spiral development process in which continually expanding software versions are based on learning from earlier development. It can also be done in phases.

Recent revisions to DoDI 5000.02 no longer refer to "spiral development," but do advocate the general approach as a baseline for software-intensive development/procurement programs. In addition, the United States Agency for International Development (USAID) also employs an iterative and incremental developmental approach to its programming cycle to design, monitor, evaluate, learn and adapt international development projects with a project management approach that focuses on incorporating collaboration, learning, and adaptation strategies to iterate and adapt programming.

== Use in hardware and embedded systems ==
While the term iterative and incremental development got started in the software industry, many hardware and embedded software development efforts are using iterative and incremental techniques.

Examples of this may be seen in a number of industries. One sector that has recently been substantially affected by this shift of thinking has been the space launch industry, with substantial new competitive forces at work brought about by faster and more extensive technology innovation brought to bear by the formation of private companies pursuing space launch. These companies, such as SpaceX and Rocket Lab, are now both providing commercial orbital launch services in the past decade, something that only six nations had done prior to a decade ago. New innovation in technology development approaches, pricing, and service offerings—including the ability that has existed only since 2016 to fly to space on a previously flown (reusable) booster stage—further decreasing the price of obtaining access to space.

SpaceX has been explicit about its effort to bring iterative design practices into the space industry, and uses the technique on spacecraft, launch vehicles, electronics and avionics, and operational flight hardware operations.

As the industry has begun to change, other launch competitors are beginning to change their long-term development practices with government agencies as well. For example, the large US launch service provider United Launch Alliance (ULA) began in 2015 a decade-long project to restructure its launch business—reducing two launch vehicles to one—using an iterative and incremental approach to get to a partially-reusable and much lower-cost launch system over the next decade.

== See also ==
- Adaptive management
- Agile software development
- Continuous integration
- DevOps § Incremental adoption
- Dynamic systems development method
- Interaction design
- Kaizen
- Microsoft Solutions Framework
- Object-oriented analysis and design
- PDCA
- Rapid application development
- Release early, release often

== Additional reading ==
- Dr. Alistair Cockburn (May 2008). "Using Both Incremental and Iterative Development" (PDF). STSC CrossTalk. 21 (5). USAF Software Technology Support Center: 27–30. ISSN 2160-1593. Archived from the original (PDF) on 2012-05-26.
- Craig Larman, Victor R. Basili (June 2003). "Iterative and Incremental Development: A Brief History" (PDF). IEEE Computer. 36 (6). IEEE Computer Society: 47–56. doi:10.1109/MC.2003.1204375. ISSN 0018-9162. S2CID 9240477.
