= Language construct =

Syntactically valid part of a program formed from lexical tokens

In computer programming, a language construct is a syntactically allowable part of a program that may be formed from one or more lexical tokens in accordance with the rules of the programming language, as defined by in the ISO/IEC 2382 standard (ISO/IEC JTC 1). A term is defined as a "linguistic construct in a conceptual schema language that refers to an entity".

While the terms "language construct" and "control structure" are often used synonymously, there are additional types of logical constructs within a computer program, including variables, expressions, functions, or modules.

Control flow statements (such as conditionals, foreach loops, while loops, etc.) are language constructs, not functions. So while (true) is a language construct, while add(10) is a function call.

== Examples of language constructs ==
In PHP print is a language construct.

<?php
print 'Hello world';
?>

is the same as:

<?php
print('Hello world');
?>

In Java a class is written in this format:

public class MyClass {
    //Code . . . . . .
}

In C++ a class is written in this format:

class MyCPlusPlusClass {
    //Code . . . .
};
