= Outline of computer programming =

Overview of and topical guide to computer programming

The following outline is provided as an overview of and topical guide to computer programming:

Computer programming – process that leads from an original formulation of a computing problem to executable computer programs. Programming involves activities such as analysis, developing understanding, generating algorithms, verification of requirements of algorithms including their correctness and resources consumption, and implementation (commonly referred to as coding) of algorithms in a target programming language. Source code is written in one or more programming languages. The purpose of programming is to find a sequence of instructions that will automate performing a given task or solving a given problem.

== History ==
- History of computer science
- History of computing hardware
  - History of computing hardware (1960s–present)
- History of programming languages
  - Timeline of programming languages
- Computer programming in the punched card era
- Timeline of operating systems

== Platforms ==
- Computer
- Computer hardware
  - Analog computer
    - Analytical Engine
  - Digital computer
    - Vacuum-tube computer
      - List of vacuum-tube computers
    - Transistor computer
      - List of transistorized computers
    - Mainframe
    - Minicomputer
    - Microcomputer
      - Home computers
      - IBM PC compatible
      - Personal computer
        - Desktop computer
        - Laptop computer
    - Mobile computer
      - Personal digital assistant (PDA)
      - Smartphone
      - Tablet computer
      - Wearable computer
    - Server
    - Supercomputer
- Virtual machine
  - Hardware virtualization
  - Runtime system

== Paradigms ==
- Agent-oriented
- Aspect-oriented
- Automata-based
- Class-based
- Concatenative
- Concept
- Concurrent
- Data-driven
- Declarative (in contrast to imperative programming)
  - Constraint
    - Constraint logic
      - Concurrent constraint logic
  - Dataflow
    - Flow-based (FBP)
    - Reactive
  - Functional
    - Functional logic
    - Purely functional
  - Logic
    - Abductive logic
    - Answer set
    - Concurrent logic
    - Functional logic
    - Inductive logic
    - Probabilistic logic
- Event-driven
  - Time-driven
- Expression-oriented
- Feature-oriented
- Function-level (in contrast to value-level programming)
- Generic
- Imperative (in contrast to declarative programming)
  - Literate
  - Procedural
- Inductive programming
- Language-oriented (LOP)
  - Natural language programming
- Non-structured (in contrast to Structured)
  - Array
- Nondeterministic
- Probabilistic
- Process-oriented
- Role-oriented
- Semantic-oriented (SOP)
- Structured (in contrast to non-structured programming)
  - Block-structured
  - Modular
    - Concurrent computing
      - Relativistic programming
  - Object-oriented (OOP)
    - Class-based
    - Concurrent OOP
    - Prototype-based
    - Subject-oriented
- Tacit
- Value-level (in contrast to function-level programming)
- Visual

== Writing programs ==
- Pseudocode

=== Methodology ===
- Array programming
- End-user development
- Metaprogramming
  - Automatic programming
  - Reflection
    - Attribute-oriented programming (AOP)
  - Homoiconicity
  - Template metaprogramming
    - Policy-based design
  - Service-oriented architecture
    - Service-oriented modeling
- Recursion
- Separation of concerns
- Threaded coding

== Algorithms ==
- List of algorithms
- List of algorithm general topics
- Algorithm characterizations
  - Introduction to Algorithms
- Theory of computation
  - Computational complexity theory
    - Analysis of algorithms
      - Empirical algorithmics
      - Big O notation
      - Algorithmic efficiency
  - Algorithmic information theory
    - Algorithmic probability
    - Algorithmically random sequence
- Search algorithm
- Sorting algorithm
- Merge algorithm
- String algorithms
- Greedy algorithm
- Reduction
- Sequential algorithm
- Parallel algorithm
  - Distributed algorithm
- Deterministic algorithm
- Randomized algorithm
- Quantum algorithm

== Programming languages ==
Programming language – formal constructed language designed to communicate instructions to a machine, particularly a computer. Programming languages can be used to create programs to control the behavior of a machine or to express algorithms.

- Generational list of programming languages
- List of programming languages by type
- List of open-source programming languages
- Alphabetical list of programming languages
  - Compiled language
  - Interpreted language
    - Scripting language
- Comparison of programming languages
- Programming language dialect
- Programming language theory
  - Formal semantics of programming languages
- Assembly language
- Macro

=== Attributes of programming languages ===
- Domain-specific language
- Dynamic programming language
- Esoteric programming language
- Extensible programming language
- High-level programming language
- Interpreted language
- Low-level programming language
- Machine programming language
- Multi-paradigm programming language
- Non-English-based programming language
- Object-based language
- Off-side rule programming language
- Reflective programming language
- Synchronous programming language
- Very high-level programming language

=== Popular languages ===
The top 20 most popular programming languages as of December 2025:

1. Python
2. C
3. C++
4. Java
5. C#
6. JavaScript
7. Visual Basic (.NET)
8. SQL
9. Perl
10. R
11. Delphi Object Pascal
12. Fortran
13. MATLAB
14. Ada
15. Go
16. PHP
17. Rust
18. Scratch
19. Assembly language
20. Kotlin

=== Anatomy of a programming language ===
- Syntax
  - Lexical grammar
  - Semicolons
- Values
- Types
- Operators
- Program structures
  - Variables
  - Expressions
  - Statements
  - Keywords and reserved words
  - Control structures
    - Subroutines (also known as functions)
      - Anonymous functions
    - Loops
      - For loops
      - While loops
    - Conditionals
      - If-then
      - If-then-else
      - Case and switch statements
- Control flow
- Data structures
  - Objects
  - Arrays
- Regular expressions

=== Comparisons of programming languages ===
Programming language comparisons

- General comparison
- Basic syntax
- Basic instructions
- Exception handling
- Enumerated types
- Anonymous functions
- Conditional expressions
- Functional instructions
- Arrays
- Associative arrays
- String operations
- String functions
- List comprehension
- Object-oriented programming
- Object-oriented constructors
- While loops
- For loops
- Evaluation strategy
- List of "Hello World" programs
- Languages with dependent types
- Comparison of type systems

==== Comparisons of individual languages ====
- ALGOL 58's influence on ALGOL 60
- ALGOL 60: Comparisons with other languages
- ALGOL 68: Comparisons with other languages
- Compatibility of C and C++
- Comparison of Pascal and Borland Delphi
- Comparison of Object Pascal and C
- Comparison of Pascal and C
- Comparison of Java and C++
- Comparison of C# and Java
- Comparison of C# and Visual Basic .NET
- Comparison of Visual Basic and Visual Basic .NET

== Compilation ==
- Programmer
- Source code
  - Parsing
- Compilation
  - Preprocessing
  - Translation
    - Assembly
  - Linking
  - Compiler optimization
  - Compilation error

== Software ==
- Computer program
  - Hello world (a common form of example program for learning programmers)
- Application software
  - Software suite
  - Database management system
- Programming software
  - Programming tool
    - Text editor
      - Source code editor
        - Integrated development environment (IDE)
    - Assembler
    - Compiler
    - Interpreter
    - Linker
    - Debugger
- System software

=== Components ===
- Instruction
- Library
- Application programming interface (API)

=== Software development ===
- Software development
  - Software development process
    - Copilot
    - Debugging
      - Human error
  - Software development methodology
    - Agile software development
    - Extreme programming

=== Software engineering ===
Software engineering –

- Implementation
- Execution
- Software architecture
- Software reliability
- Software quality
- Software testing
- Software maintenance
- Software optimization
- Software brittleness

== See also ==
- Outline of computers
  - Outline of computing
    - Outline of computer science
      - Outline of artificial intelligence
      - Outline of cryptography
    - Outline of the Internet
      - Outline of Google
    - Outline of software
      - Types of software
        - Outline of free software
        - Outline of search engines
      - Outline of software development
        - Outline of software engineering
        - Outline of web design and web development
        - Outline of computer programming
          - Programming languages
            - Outline of the C programming language
            - Outline of the C++ programming language
            - Outline of the C sharp programming language
            - Outline of the Java programming language
            - Outline of the JavaScript programming language
            - Outline of the Perl programming language
            - Outline of the Python programming language
            - Outline of the Rust programming language
