= Hoodie (disambiguation) =

A hoodie (also spelled hoody) is a type of jacket with a hood.

Hoodie or hoody may also refer to:

- "Hoodie" (Lady Sovereign song), from the album Public Warning
- "Hoodie" (Omarion song), from the album Ollusion
- "Hoodie", a 2022 song by Ari Lennox from Age/Sex/Location
- "Hoodie", a 2017 song by Hey Violet from From the Outside
- An abbreviation for "hoodiecrow", the hooded crow, a bird
- Hoodie Allen, American hip-hop artist
- an alternative term for chav, a stereotype used in Britain
- Hoodie (software), open-source Javascript package, that enables offline first, Front-end web development
- Hoody (singer) (born 1990), South Korean singer-songwriter

== See also ==
- The Tale of the Hoodie, a Scottish fairy tale involving a hooded crow
- Hu Die (actress), a Chinese actress
