= Hoodie (software) =

- Original author(s): Jan Lehnardt, Gregor Martynus
- Developer(s): Hoodie Open Source Project
- Initial release: 2013; 12 years ago
- Stable release: 8 / 7 November 2019; 5 years ago
- Written in: JavaScript
- Operating system: cross-platform: Unix-like (Linux, macOS), Windows
- Platform: x86-64
- Type: Web development
- License: Apache 2.0
- Website: hood.ie

In computing, Hoodie is a software package, that enables offline-first, front-end web development by providing a complete backend infrastructure. It aims to allow developers to rapidly develop web applications using only front-end code by providing a backend based on Node.js and Apache CouchDB. It runs on many Unix-like systems, and Microsoft Windows. It is written in JavaScript, and is free and open-source software released under an Apache License 2.0.

Hoodie is produced by the Hoodie Open Source Project, founded by Jan Lehnardt and Gregor Martynus in 2011 and first released in 2013.

== Overview ==
Hoodie is designed to abstract away the configuration and communication between the database backend and allow web-based front end development using simple calls to the Hoodie application programming interface (API). Hoodie uses CouchDB to store data for the application. If the application is offline and cannot access the CouchDB database, data is stored locally on the device in the offline PouchDB database. The data will later be synced to CouchDB when the connection to the server is re-established, using CouchDB's database synchronisation feature.

Hoodie depends on Node.js and Node Package Manager (npm) to allow it to be used from the command line and to provide other tools for Hoodie projects. When Hoodie and its dependencies are installed, a skeleton project directory and basic files to start an application including index.html and main.js are created. Hoodie can also be used with large web application frameworks including Backbone.js, Ember.js, and AngularJS.

The core Hoodie package is targeted at creating personal applications and saving user data to personal storage areas. For instance, for to-do lists, memos or favourite book lists. A set of basic commands is provided to achieve these functions, which includes user signup, login, store, and more. Hoodie extensions provide functions beyond the core backend commands. Extensions can be written by anyone and use the npm package system. For instance, an extension to store data globally and allow multiple users to share and collaborate on the same data can be installed.

== See also ==
- CouchDB
