= Business-Broadband =

Former British Internet Service Provider(ISP)

Business-Broadband.net
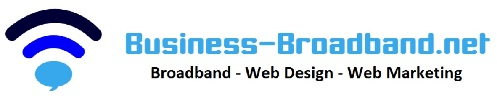
- Company type: Holding Company
- Industry: Broadband Internet, Web design, VoIP, Telephony
- Founded: 2011 (as Invictel Ltd)
- Headquarters: Truro, Cornwall, England
- Products: Internet services Landline telephone services
- Website: www.business-broadband.net

Business-Broadband was a British internet service provider (ISP); providing residential and business broadband, Web design, Website development and telephone landline services within the United Kingdom. The company was founded in 2011 in Canterbury, Kent.

On 30 January 2017, Business-Broadband announced that it had over 750,000 customers across the UK although there was no verified evidence of this.

== History ==
=== Origins ===
Business-Broadband's origins go back to 2 April 2011, when Invictel Ltd, a residential broadband telecoms company, launched. Due to its success, Invictel Ltd incorporated Lixxus, a defunct broadband company, in December 2011. In 2016, Invictel was rebranded to that of Business-Broadband.net and the business relocated to its new headquarters in Truro, Cornwall.

== Business-Broadband.net ==
=== Services ===
Business-Broadband currently provided asymmetric digital subscriber line (ADSL) broadband and Fibre broadband internet products to residential and business customers along with landline telephone products to the same customers. Business-Broadband.net also offer web design, website development, Search Engine Optimization and Marketing services.
