= Gambas =

Integrated development environment

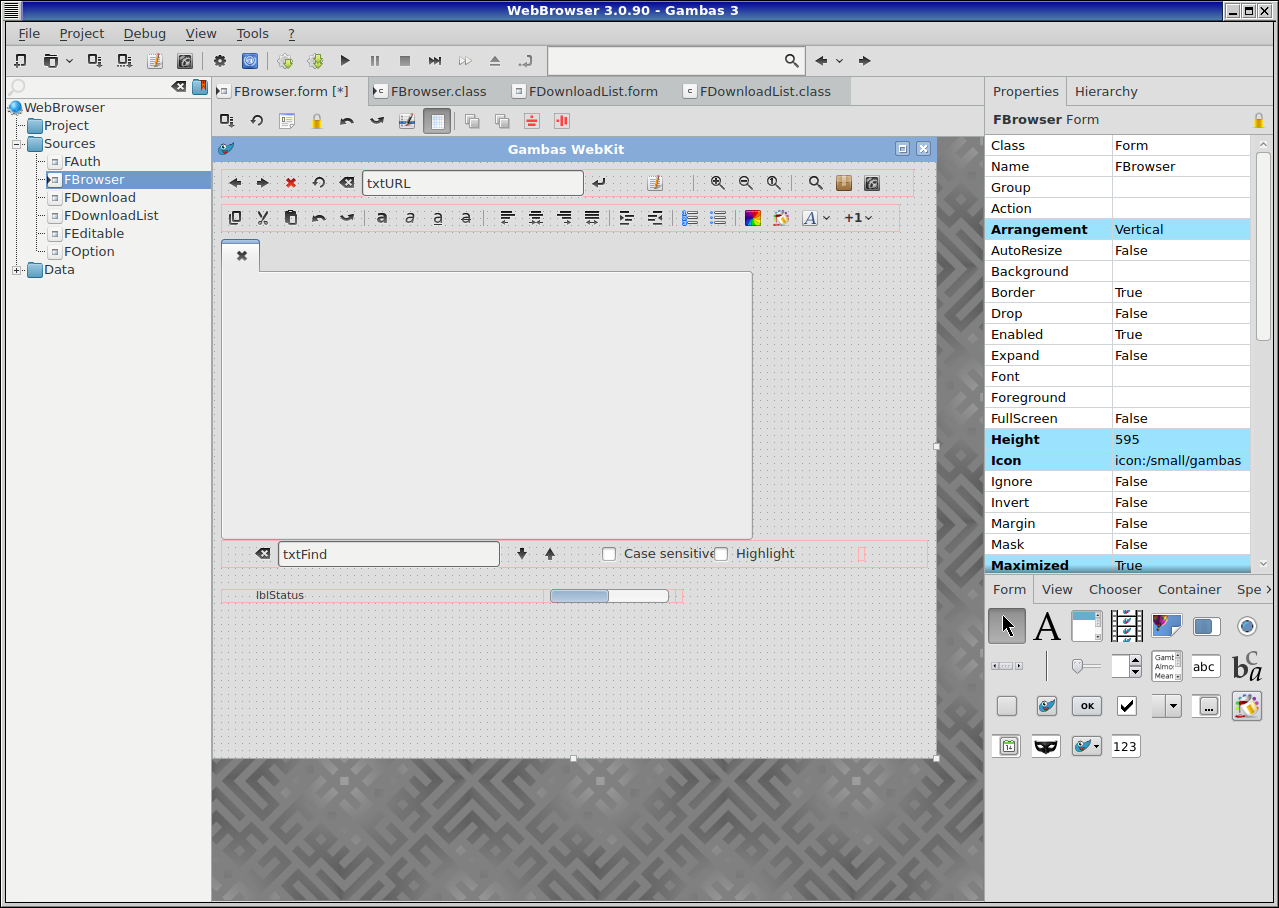
- Gambas 3.3.4 running on Fedora 16 with Xfce
- Designed by: Benoît Minisini
- First appeared: 1999; 27 years ago
- Stable release: 3.22.2 / October 13, 2026; 8 days ago
- OS: Linux, FreeBSD; versions for Mac OS X and Haiku drafted; Microsoft Windows through Cygwin and WSL
- License: GNU GPLv2+
- Website: gambaswiki.org/website

Influenced by
- Visual Basic, Java

Gambas is an object-oriented dialect of the BASIC programming language, and an integrated development environment that accompanies it. Designed to run on Linux and other Unix-like computer operating systems, its name is a recursive acronym for Gambas Almost Means BASIC. Gambas is also the word for prawns in the Spanish, French, and Portuguese languages, from which the project's logos are derived.

== History ==
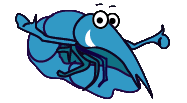
Gambas 1.x Logo

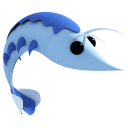
Gambas 2.x Logo

Gambas was developed by the French programmer Benoît Minisini, with its first release coming in 1999. Benoît had grown up with the BASIC language, and decided to make a free software development environment that could quickly and easily make programs with user interfaces.

The Gambas 1.x versions were first released on January 4, 2005, and featured an interface made up of several different separate windows for forms and IDE dialogues in a similar fashion to the interface of earlier versions of the GIMP. It could also only develop applications using Qt and was more oriented towards the development of applications for KDE. The last release of the 1.x versions was Gambas 1.0.19.

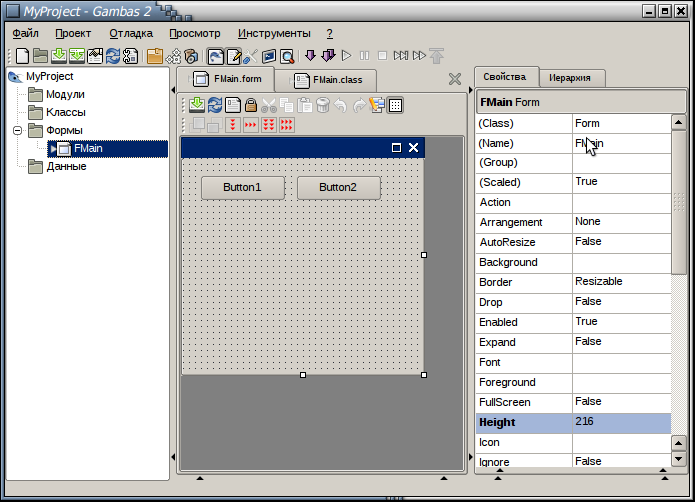
Gambas 2.7 with Russian interface on Ubuntu 8.10

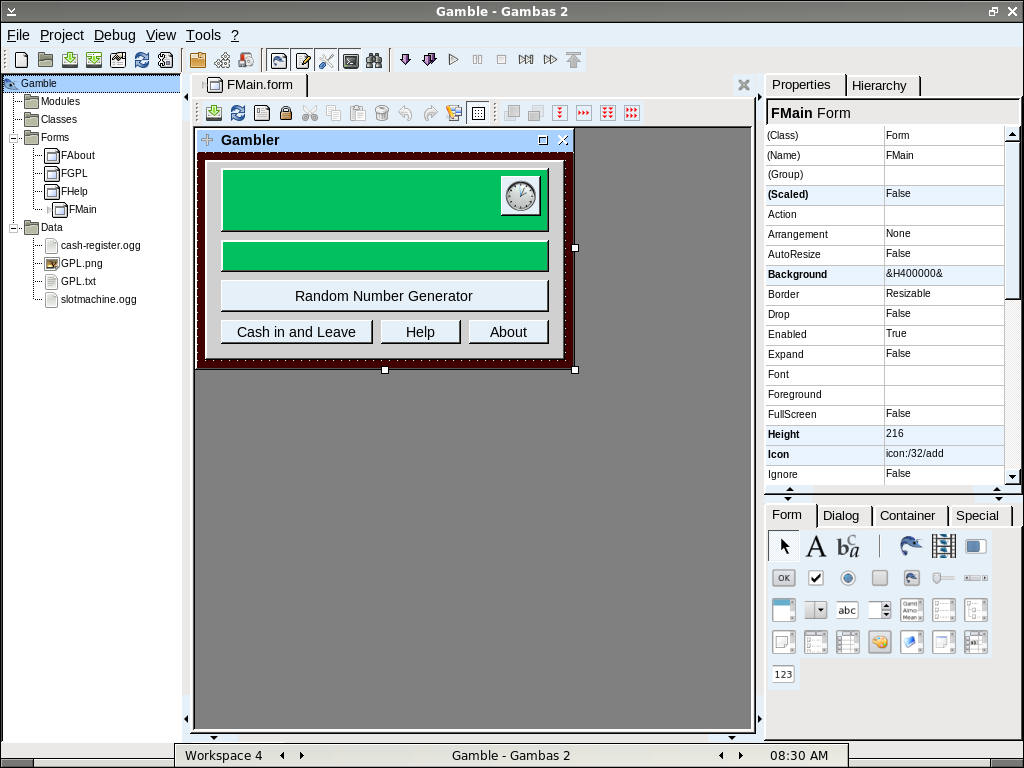
Gambas 2.7 running on Fedora Linux with Blackbox

The first of the 2.x versions was released on January 2, 2008, after three to four years of development. It featured a major redesign of the interface, now with all forms and functions embedded in a single window, as well as some changes to the Gambas syntax, although for the most part code compatibility was kept. It featured major updates to existing Gambas components as well as the addition of some new ones, such as new components that could use GTK+ or SDL for drawing or utilize OpenGL acceleration. Gambas 2.x versions can load up and run Gambas 1.x projects, with occasional incompatibilities; the same is true for Gambas 2.x to 3.x, but not from Gambas 1.x to 3.x.

The next major iteration of Gambas, the 3.x versions, was released on December 31, 2011. A 2015 benchmark published on the Gambas website showed Gambas 3.8.90 scripting as being faster to varying degrees than Perl 5.20.2 and the then-latest 2.7.10 version of Python in many tests. Version 3.16.0 released on April 20, 2021, featured full support for Wayland using the graphical components, as well as parity between the Qt 5 and GTK 3 components.

== Features ==
Gambas is designed to build graphical programs using the Qt (currently Qt 4.x or 5.x since 3.8.0) or the GTK toolkit (GTK 3.x also supported as of 3.6.0); the Gambas IDE is written in Gambas. Gambas includes a GUI designer to aid in creating user interfaces in an event-driven style, but can also make command line applications, as well as text-based user interfaces using the ncurses toolkit. The Gambas runtime environment is needed to run executables.

Functionality is provided by a variety of components, each of which can be selected to provide additional features. Drawing can be provided either through Qt and GTK toolkits, with an additional component which is designed to switch between them. Drawing can also be provided through the Simple DirectMedia Layer (originally version 1.x, with 2.x added as of 3.7.0), which can also be utilized for audio playback through a separate sound component (a component for the OpenAL specification has also been added). GPU acceleration support is available through an OpenGL component, as well as other hardware functionally provided by various other components. There are also components for handling other specialized tasks.

With Gambas, developers can also use databases such as MySQL or PostgreSQL, build KDE (Qt) and GNOME GTK applications with DCOP, translate Visual Basic programs to Gambas and run them under Linux, build network solutions, and create CGI web applications. The IDE also includes a tool for the creation of installation packages, supporting GNU Autotools, slackpkg, pacman, RPM, and debs (the latter two then tailored for specific distributions such as Fedora/RHEL/CentOS, Mageia, Mandriva, OpenSUSE and Debian, Ubuntu/Mint). Support for AppImage building was mainlined with version 3.19.0.

Gambas since version 3.2 IDE has integrated profiler and it started to use just-in-time compilation technology.

=== Differences from Visual Basic ===
Gambas is intended to provide a similar experience as developing in Microsoft Visual Basic, but it is not a free software clone of the popular proprietary program. The author of Gambas makes it clear that there are similarities to Visual Basic, such as syntax for BASIC programs and the integrated development environment; Gambas was written from the start to be a development environment of its own and seeks to improve on the formula.

Its object model, each class being represented in a file, as well as the archiver to package the program is all inspired by the Java programming language. Gambas is intended to be an alternative for former Visual Basic developers who have decided to migrate to Linux. There are also other important distinctions between Gambas and Visual Basic. One notable example is that in Gambas array indexes always start with 0, whereas Visual Basic indexes can start with 0 or 1. Gambas also supports the += and -= shorthand not found in classic Visual Basic. Both of these are features of Visual Basic .NET however.

Gambas also outlived two other attempts at implementing a Visual Basic style interface for Qt and GTK on Linux, those being HBasic and GNOME Basic, as well as the platform independent KBasic/Basic for Qt. Similar style IDEs have since been developed as well for FreeBASIC, namely VisualFBEditor, and QB64, namely InForm.

== Adoption ==
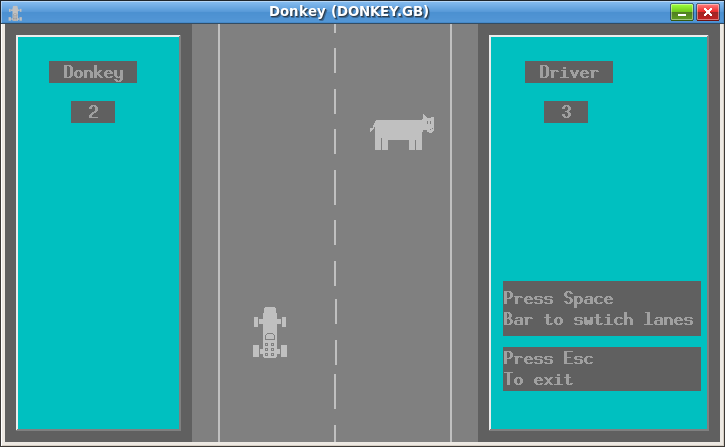
DONKEY.GB

Several programs and many forms of example code have been written using and for Gambas. Freecode (formerly Freshmeat) listed 23 applications that were developed using Gambas, while the Gambas wiki listed 82; several other specialized sites list Gambas applications and code.

A Gambas written application, named Gambas3 ShowCase, acted as a software center to download or install Gambas 3 applications. It has since been discontinued following the launch of the first party Gambas Software Farm integrated into the IDE since 3.7.1, which contains nearly 500 applications and demos. Several community sites, including community forums and mailing lists, also exist for Gambas.

Notable applications written in Gambas include Xt7-player-mpv, a GUI frontend for mpv player contained in a number of Linux software repositories, and I-Nex, a program for displaying hardware data. The comisat Games Collection are early examples of video games written in Gambas.

== Availability ==
Gambas is included in the repositories of a number of Linux distributions, such as Debian, Fedora, Slackware, Arch Linux, Mageia, PCLinuxOS, Linux Mint and Ubuntu. A Microsoft Windows version of Gambas was run under the Cygwin environment, although this version was significantly less tested than its Linux counterparts and was command-line only; Cooperative Linux and derivatives have also been used, as well as specialized Linux virtual machines. An independent contributor, François Gallo, also worked on porting Gambas 3.x to Mac OS X and FreeBSD, based on using local versions of the X11 system. A build for Haiku has also been worked on by Francois Revol. Gambas from version 3.2 can run on Raspberry Pi, and offers just-in-time compilation there from version 3.12. It can also be run from the cloud using rollApp.

In November 2013, the future portability of Gambas was discussed, listing the main concerns being Linux kernel features utilized in the interpreter, components using Linux specific software and libraries, and primarily X11-tying in the Qt, GTK and desktop integration components. However, partly due to the need to upgrade to newer toolkits such as GTK 3 (added as of 3.6.0) and Qt 5 (as of 3.8.0), future versions would be less X11 tied, making projects like Cygwin or utterly native versions on other platforms more possible. Benoît Minisini stated that he intended to "encapsulate" X11 specific code to aid in any attempt to replace it, with the X11 support in the desktop component moved to its own component as of 3.6.0.

On October 27, 2016, a screenshot and setup guide was released from the main page for running Gambas fully through Cygwin, including most components, graphical toolkits, and the complete IDE. The relevant patches were mainlined as of version 3.9.2. This replaces the prior recommended method of using freenx forwarding from a Linux server. It has also been successfully run using the Windows Subsystem for Linux. This was usually done using an X terminal emulator such Mobaxterm on Windows, as WSL did not support X11 graphics directly until Windows 11.

== Example code ==
A "Hello, World!" program with graphical user interface.

Public Sub Main()
    Message("Hello, World!")
End

Program that computes a 100-term polynomial 500000 times, and repeats it ten times (used for benchmarking).

Private Sub Test(X As Float) As Float

    Dim Mu As Float = 10.0
    Dim Pu, Su As Float
    Dim I, J, N As Integer
    Dim aPoly As New Float[100]

    N = 500000

    For I = 0 To N - 1
        For J = 0 To 99
           Mu =  (Mu + 2.0) / 2.0
           aPoly[J] = Mu
        Next
        Su = 0.0
        For J = 0 To 99
            Su = X * Su + aPoly[J]
        Next
        Pu += Su
    Next

    Return Pu

End

Public Sub Main()

    Dim I as Integer

    For I = 1 To 10
        Print Test(0.2)
    Next

End

== See also ==
- List of BASIC dialects
- Comparison of integrated development environments#BASIC
- GNAVI
- Lazarus
