= Dwana Franklin-Davis =

Dwana Franklin-Davis is a technologist and tech leader. She is the inaugural CEO of Reboot Representation, a coalition of tech companies whose mission is to significantly increase the number of Black, Latina, and Native American women and girls in tech. Led by Franklin-Davis, Reboot Representation invests in programs and institutions that expand accessibility to careers in computing. In 2020 they partnered with the United Negro College Fund and established the Black Females moving Forward in Computing program.

Franklin-Davis previously held leadership positions at Mastercard and IBM. She is a founding member of Mastercard's Business Resource Group, Leveraging Employees of African Descent. She was also president of the St. Louis chapter for the Black Data Processing Associates.

== Education ==
Franklin-Davis attended Purdue University as an undergraduate. Initially majoring in computer science, she transferred to the Krannert School of Management during her junior year and earned a Bachelor of Science in Management. She graduated with a Masters of Information Management from Washington University.
