= Web administration =

Web administration may refer to:

- System administrator
- Web development
- Web design
