= Comparison of programming languages (associative array) =

This comparison of programming languages (associative arrays) compares the features of associative array data structures or array-lookup processing for over 40 computer programming languages.

== Language support ==
The following is a comparison of associative arrays (also "mapping", "hash", and "dictionary") in various programming languages.

=== AWK ===
AWK has built-in, language-level support for associative arrays.

For example:

phonebook["Sally Smart"] = "555-9999"
phonebook["John Doe"] = "555-1212"
phonebook["J. Random Hacker"] = "555-1337"

The following code loops through an associated array and prints its contents:

for (name in phonebook) {
	print name, " ", phonebook[name]
}

The user can search for elements in an associative array, and delete elements from the array.

The following shows how multi-dimensional associative arrays can be simulated in standard AWK using concatenation and the built-in string-separator variable SUBSEP:

{ # for every input line
	multi[$1 SUBSEP $2]++;
}
#
END {
	for (x in multi) {
		split(x, arr, SUBSEP);
		print arr[1], arr[2], multi[x];
	}
}

=== C ===
There is no standard implementation of associative arrays in C, but a 3rd-party library, C Hash Table, with BSD license, is available.

Another 3rd-party library, uthash, also creates associative arrays from C structures. A structure represents a value, and one of the structure fields serves as the key.

Finally, the GLib library also supports associative arrays, along with many other advanced data types and is the recommended implementation of the GNU Project.

Similar to GLib, Apple's cross-platform Core Foundation framework provides several basic data types. In particular, there are reference-counted CFDictionary and CFMutableDictionary.

=== C# ===
C# uses the collection classes provided by the .NET Framework. The most commonly used associative array type is System.Collections.Generic.Dictionary<TKey, TValue>, which is implemented as a mutable hash table. The relatively new System.Collections.Immutable package, available in .NET Framework versions 4.5 and above, and in all versions of .NET Core, also includes the System.Collections.Immutable.Dictionary<TKey, TValue> type, which is implemented using an AVL tree. The methods that would normally mutate the object in-place instead return a new object that represents the state of the original object after mutation.

==== Creation ====
The following demonstrates three means of populating a mutable dictionary:

- the Add method, which adds a key and value and throws an exception if the key already exists in the dictionary;
- assigning to the indexer, which overwrites any existing value, if present; and
- assigning to the backing property of the indexer, for which the indexer is syntactic sugar (not applicable to C#, see F# or VB.NET examples).

using System.Collections.Generic;

Dictionary<string, string> phoneBook = new();
phoneBook.Add("Sally Smart", "555-9999");
phoneBook["John Doe"] = "555-1212";
// Not allowed in C#.
// phoneBook.Item("J. Random Hacker") = "553-1337";
phoneBook["J. Random Hacker"] = "553-1337";

The dictionary can also be initialized during construction using a "collection initializer", which compiles to repeated calls to Add.

using System.Collections.Generic;

Dictionary<string, string> phoneBook = new() {
    { "Sally Smart", "555-9999" },
    { "John Doe", "555-1212" },
    { "J. Random Hacker", "553-1337" }
};

==== Access by key ====
Values are primarily retrieved using the indexer (which throws an exception if the key does not exist) and the TryGetValue() method, which has an output parameter for the sought value and a Boolean return-value indicating whether the key was found.

string sallyNumber = phoneBook["Sally Smart"];

string sallyNumber = (phoneBook.TryGetValue("Sally Smart", out string result) ? result : "n/a";

In this example, the sallyNumber value will now contain the string "555-9999".

==== Enumeration ====
A dictionary can be viewed as a sequence of keys, sequence of values, or sequence of pairs of keys and values represented by instances of the KeyValuePair<TKey, TValue> type, although there is no guarantee of order. For a sorted dictionary, the programmer could choose to use a SortedDictionary<TKey, TValue> or use the .Sort LINQ extension method when enumerating.

The following demonstrates enumeration using a foreach loop:

using System;
using System.Collections.Generic;

// loop through the collection and display each entry.
foreach (KeyValuePair<string, string> kvp in phoneBook)
{
    Console.WriteLine("Phone number for {0} is {1}", kvp.Key, kvp.Value);
}

=== C++ ===
In C++, there are four associative array classes: std::map (a red-black tree, equivalent to TreeMap in other languages) and std::unordered_map (a hash table, equivalent to HashMap in other languages). The other two are std::multimap and std::unordered_multimap, which permit multiple entries with the same key.

These classes are templated which allow the data types of keys and values to be different for different collection instances. For a given instance of the map class the keys must be of the same base type. The same must be true for all of the values. Although std::map is typically implemented using a self-balancing binary search tree, C++11 defines a second map called std::unordered_map, which has the algorithmic characteristics of a hash table. This is a common vendor extension to the Standard Template Library (STL) as well, usually called hash_map, available from such implementations as SGI and STLPort.

import std;

using std::string;
using std::unordered_map;
 
int main(int argc, char* argv[]) {
	unordered_map<string, string> phoneBook;
	phoneBook.insert(std::make_pair("Sally Smart", "555-9999"));
	phoneBook.insert(std::make_pair("John Doe", "555-1212"));
	phoneBook.insert(std::make_pair("J. Random Hacker", "553-1337"));
}

Or less efficiently, as this creates temporary std::string values:

import std;

using std::string;
using std::unordered_map;
 
int main(int argc, char* argv[]) {
	unordered_map<string, string> phoneBook;
	phoneBook["Sally Smart"] = "555-9999";
	phoneBook["John Doe"] = "555-1212";
	phoneBook["J. Random Hacker"] = "553-1337";
}

With the extension of initialization lists in C++11, entries can be added during a map's construction as shown below:

import std;

using std::string;
using std::unordered_map;

int main() {
	unordered_map<string, string> phoneBook {
		{"Sally Smart", "555-9999"},
		{"John Doe", "555-1212"},
		{"J. Random Hacker", "553-1337"}
	};
}

You can iterate through the list with the following code (C++03):

// 'it' is of type std::unordered_map<std::string, std::string>::iterator
for (auto it = phoneBook.begin(); it != phoneBook.end(); ++it) {
    std::println("{} = {}", it->first, it->second);
}

The same task in C++11:

using std::pair;
using std::string;

for (const pair<string, string>& it: phoneBook) {
    std::println("{} = {}", it->first, it->second);
}

Using the structured binding available in C++17:

for (const auto& [name, number]: phoneBook) {
    std::println("{} = {}", name, number);
}

=== Cobra ===
Initializing an empty dictionary and adding items in Cobra:

dic as Dictionary<of String, String> = Dictionary<of String, String>()
dic.add('Sally Smart', '555-9999')
dic.add('John Doe', '555-1212')
dic.add('J. Random Hacker', '553-1337')
 
assert dic['Sally Smart'] == '555-9999'

Alternatively, a dictionary can be initialized with all items during construction:

dic = {
          'Sally Smart':'555-9999',
          'John Doe':'555-1212',
          'J. Random Hacker':'553-1337'
      }

The dictionary can be enumerated by a for-loop, but there is no guaranteed order:

for key, val in dic
    print "[key]'s phone number is [val]"

=== ColdFusion Markup Language ===
A structure in ColdFusion Markup Language (CFML) is equivalent to an associative array:

dynamicKeyName = "John Doe";
phoneBook = {
	"Sally Smart" = "555-9999",
	"#dynamicKeyName#" = "555-4321",
	"J. Random Hacker" = "555-1337",	
	UnknownComic = "???"
};
writeOutput(phoneBook.UnknownComic); // ???
writeDump(phoneBook); // entire struct

=== D ===
D offers direct support for associative arrays in the core language; such arrays are implemented as a hash table with open addressing. The equivalent example would be:

int main() {
	string[ string ] phone_book;
	phone_book["Sally Smart"] = "555-9999";
	phone_book["John Doe"] = "555-1212";
	phone_book["J. Random Hacker"] = "553-1337";
	return 0;
}

Keys and values can be any types, but all the keys in an associative array must be of the same type, and the same goes for dependent values.

Looping through all properties and associated values, and printing them, can be coded as follows:

foreach (key, value; phone_book) {
    writefln("Number for %s: %s", key, value);
}

A property can be removed as follows:

phone_book.remove("Sally Smart");

=== Delphi ===
Delphi supports several standard containers, including TDictionary<T>:

uses
  SysUtils,
  Generics.Collections;

var
  PhoneBook: TDictionary<string, string>;
  Entry: TPair<string, string>;

begin
  PhoneBook := TDictionary<string, string>.Create;
  PhoneBook.Add('Sally Smart', '555-9999');
  PhoneBook.Add('John Doe', '555-1212');
  PhoneBook.Add('J. Random Hacker', '553-1337');

  for Entry in PhoneBook do
    Writeln(Format('Number for %s: %s',[Entry.Key, Entry.Value]));
end.

Pre-2009 Delphi versions do not support associative arrays directly. Such arrays can be simulated using the TStrings class:

procedure TForm1.Button1Click(Sender: TObject);
var
  DataField: TStrings;
  i: Integer;
begin
  DataField := TStringList.Create;

  DataField.Values['Sally Smart'] := '555-9999';
  DataField.Values['John Doe'] := '555-1212';
  DataField.Values['J. Random Hacker'] := '553-1337';

  // access an entry and display it in a message box
  ShowMessage(DataField.Values['Sally Smart']);

  // loop through the associative array 
  for i := 0 to DataField.Count - 1 do
  begin
    ShowMessage('Number for ' + DataField.Names[i] + ': ' + DataField.ValueFromIndex[i]);
  end;

  DataField.Free;
end;

=== Erlang ===
Erlang offers many ways to represent mappings; three of the most common in the standard library are keylists, dictionaries, and maps.

==== Keylists ====
Keylists are lists of tuples, where the first element of each tuple is a key, and the second is a value. Functions for operating on keylists are provided in the lists module.

PhoneBook = [{"Sally Smith", "555-9999"},
             {"John Doe", "555-1212"},
             {"J. Random Hacker", "553-1337"}].

Accessing an element of the keylist can be done with the lists:keyfind/3 function:

{_, Phone} = lists:keyfind("Sally Smith", 1, PhoneBook),
io:format("Phone number: ~s~n", [Phone]).

==== Dictionaries ====
Dictionaries are implemented in the dict module of the standard library. A new dictionary is created using the dict:new/0 function and new key/value pairs are stored using the dict:store/3 function:

PhoneBook1 = dict:new(),
PhoneBook2 = dict:store("Sally Smith", "555-9999", Dict1),
PhoneBook3 = dict:store("John Doe", "555-1212", Dict2),
PhoneBook = dict:store("J. Random Hacker", "553-1337", Dict3).

Such a serial initialization would be more idiomatically represented in Erlang with the appropriate function:

PhoneBook = dict:from_list([{"Sally Smith", "555-9999"},
                            {"John Doe", "555-1212"},
                            {"J. Random Hacker", "553-1337"}]).

The dictionary can be accessed using the dict:find/2 function:

{ok, Phone} = dict:find("Sally Smith", PhoneBook),
io:format("Phone: ~s~n", [Phone]).

In both cases, any Erlang term can be used as the key. Variations include the orddict module, implementing ordered dictionaries, and gb_trees, implementing general balanced trees.

==== Maps ====
Maps were introduced in OTP 17.0, and combine the strengths of keylists and dictionaries. A map is defined using the syntax #{ K1 => V1, ... Kn => Vn }:

PhoneBook = #{"Sally Smith" => "555-9999",
              "John Doe" => "555-1212",
              "J. Random Hacker" => "553-1337"}.

Basic functions to interact with maps are available from the maps module. For example, the maps:find/2 function returns the value associated with a key:

{ok, Phone} = maps:find("Sally Smith", PhoneBook),
io:format("Phone: ~s~n", [Phone]).

Unlike dictionaries, maps can be pattern matched upon:

#{"Sally Smith", Phone} = PhoneBook,
io:format("Phone: ~s~n", [Phone]).

Erlang also provides syntax sugar for functional updates—creating a new map based on an existing one, but with modified values or additional keys:

PhoneBook2 = PhoneBook#{
    % the `:=` operator updates the value associated with an existing key
    "J. Random Hacker" := "355-7331",

    % the `=>` operator adds a new key-value pair, potentially replacing an existing one
    "Alice Wonderland" => "555-1865"
}

=== F# ===
==== Map<'Key,'Value> ====
At runtime, F# provides the Collections.Map<'Key,'Value> type, which is an immutable AVL tree.

===== Creation =====
The following example calls the Map constructor, which operates on a list (a semicolon delimited sequence of elements enclosed in square brackets) of tuples (which in F# are comma-delimited sequences of elements).

let numbers =
    [
        "Sally Smart", "555-9999"; 
        "John Doe", "555-1212";
        "J. Random Hacker", "555-1337"
    ] |> Map

===== Access by key =====
Values can be looked up via one of the Map members, such as its indexer or Item property (which throw an exception if the key does not exist) or the TryFind function, which returns an option type with a value of Some <result>, for a successful lookup, or None, for an unsuccessful one. Pattern matching can then be used to extract the raw value from the result, or a default value can be set.

let sallyNumber = numbers.["Sally Smart"]
// or
let sallyNumber = numbers.Item("Sally Smart")

let sallyNumber =
    match numbers.TryFind("Sally Smart") with
    | Some(number) -> number
    | None         -> "n/a"

In both examples above, the sallyNumber value would contain the string "555-9999".

==== Dictionary<'TKey,'TValue> ====
Because F# is a .NET language, it also has access to features of the .NET Framework, including the System.Collections.Generic.Dictionary<'TKey,'TValue> type (which is implemented as a hash table), which is the primary associative array type used in C# and Visual Basic. This type may be preferred when writing code that is intended to operate with other languages on the .NET Framework, or when the performance characteristics of a hash table are preferred over those of an AVL tree.

===== Creation =====
The dict function provides a means of conveniently creating a .NET dictionary that is not intended to be mutated; it accepts a sequence of tuples and returns an immutable object that implements IDictionary<'TKey,'TValue>.

let numbers =
    [
        "Sally Smart", "555-9999"; 
        "John Doe", "555-1212";
        "J. Random Hacker", "555-1337"
    ] |> dict

When a mutable dictionary is needed, the constructor of System.Collections.Generic.Dictionary<'TKey,'TValue> can be called directly. See the C# example on this page for additional information.

let numbers = System.Collections.Generic.Dictionary<string, string>()
numbers.Add("Sally Smart", "555-9999")
numbers.["John Doe"] <- "555-1212"
numbers.Item("J. Random Hacker") <-  "555-1337"

===== Access by key =====
IDictionary instances have an indexer that is used in the same way as Map, although the equivalent to TryFind is TryGetValue, which has an output parameter for the sought value and a Boolean return value indicating whether the key was found.

let sallyNumber =
    let mutable result = ""
    if numbers.TryGetValue("Sally Smart", &result) then result else "n/a"

F# also allows the function to be called as if it had no output parameter and instead returned a tuple containing its regular return value and the value assigned to the output parameter:

let sallyNumber =
    match numbers.TryGetValue("Sally Smart") with
    | true, number -> number
    | _     -> "n/a"

==== Enumeration ====
A dictionary or map can be enumerated using Seq.map.

// loop through the collection and display each entry.
numbers |> Seq.map (fun kvp -> printfn "Phone number for %O is %O" kvp.Key kvp.Value)

=== FoxPro ===
Visual FoxPro implements mapping with the Collection Class.

mapping = NEWOBJECT("Collection")
mapping.Add("Daffodils", "flower2") && Add(object, key) – key must be character
index   = mapping.GetKey("flower2") && returns the index value 1
object  = mapping("flower2")        && returns "Daffodils" (retrieve by key)
object  = mapping(1)                && returns "Daffodils" (retrieve by index)

GetKey returns 0 if the key is not found.

=== Go ===
Go has built-in, language-level support for associative arrays, called "maps". A map's key type may only be a boolean, numeric, string, array, struct, pointer, interface, or channel type.

A map type is written: map[keytype]valuetype

Adding elements one at a time:

phone_book := make(map[string] string) // make an empty map
phone_book["Sally Smart"] = "555-9999"
phone_book["John Doe"] = "555-1212"
phone_book["J. Random Hacker"] = "553-1337"

A map literal:

phone_book := map[string] string {
	"Sally Smart": "555-9999",
	"John Doe": "555-1212",
	"J. Random Hacker": "553-1337",
}

Iterating through a map:

// over both keys and values
for key, value := range phone_book {
	fmt.Printf("Number for %s: %s\n", key, value)
}

// over just keys
for key := range phone_book {
	fmt.Printf("Name: %s\n", key)
}

=== Haskell ===
The Haskell programming language provides only one kind of associative container – a list of pairs:

m = [("Sally Smart", "555-9999"), ("John Doe", "555-1212"), ("J. Random Hacker", "553-1337")]

main = print (lookup "John Doe" m)

output:

Just "555-1212"

Note that the lookup function returns a "Maybe" value, which is "Nothing" if not found, or "Just 'result'" when found.

The Glasgow Haskell Compiler (GHC), the most commonly used implementation of Haskell, provides two more types of associative containers. Other implementations may also provide these.

One is polymorphic functional maps (represented as immutable balanced binary trees):

import qualified Data.Map as M

m = M.insert "Sally Smart" "555-9999" M.empty
m' = M.insert "John Doe" "555-1212" m
m'' = M.insert "J. Random Hacker" "553-1337" m'

main = print (M.lookup "John Doe" m'' :: Maybe String)

output:

Just "555-1212"

A specialized version for integer keys also exists as Data.IntMap.

Finally, a polymorphic hash table:

import qualified Data.HashTable as H

main = do m <- H.new (==) H.hashString
          H.insert m "Sally Smart" "555-9999"
          H.insert m "John Doe" "555-1212"
          H.insert m "J. Random Hacker" "553-1337"
          foo <- H.lookup m "John Doe"
          print foo

output:

Just "555-1212"

Lists of pairs and functional maps both provide a purely functional interface, which is more idiomatic in Haskell. In contrast, hash tables provide an imperative interface in the IO monad.

=== Java ===
In Java associative arrays are implemented as "maps", which are part of the Java collections framework. Since J2SE 5.0 and the introduction of generics into Java, collections can have a type specified; for example, an associative array that maps strings to strings might be specified as follows:

Map<String, String> phoneBook = new HashMap<String, String>();
phoneBook.put("Sally Smart", "555-9999");
phoneBook.put("John Doe", "555-1212");
phoneBook.put("J. Random Hacker", "555-1337");

The get method is used to access a key; for example, the value of the expression phoneBook.get("Sally Smart") is "555-9999". This code uses a hash map to store the associative array, by calling the constructor of the java.util.HashMap class. However, since the code only uses methods common to the interface java.util.Map, a self-balancing binary tree could be used by calling the constructor of the java.util.TreeMap class (which implements the subinterface java.util.SortedMap), without changing the definition of the phoneBook variable, or the rest of the code, or using other underlying data structures that implement the java.util.Map<K, V> interface.

The hash function in Java, used by HashMap and HashSet, is provided by the Object.hashCode() method. Since every class in Java inherits from java.lang.Object, every object has a hash function. A class can override the default implementation of hashCode() to provide a custom hash function more in accordance with the properties of the object.

The java.lang.Object class also contains the equals(Object) method, which tests an object for equality with another object. Hashed data structures in Java rely on objects maintaining the following contract between their hashCode() and equals() methods:

For two objects a and b,

a.equals(b) == b.equals(a)
if a.equals(b), then a.hashCode() == b.hashCode()

In order to maintain this contract, a class that overrides equals() must also override hashCode(), and vice versa, so that hashCode() is based on the same properties (or a subset of the properties) as equals().

A further contract that a hashed data structure has with the object is that the results of the hashCode() and equals() methods will not change once the object has been inserted into the map. For this reason, it is generally a good practice to base the hash function on immutable properties of the object.

Analogously, TreeMap, and other sorted data structures, require that an ordering be defined on the data type. Either the data type must already have defined its own ordering, by implementing the java.lang.Comparable interface; or a custom java.lang.Comparator must be provided at the time the map is constructed. As with HashMap above, the relative ordering of keys in a TreeMap should not change once they have been inserted into the map.

=== JavaScript ===
JavaScript (and its standardized version, ECMAScript) is a prototype-based object-oriented language.

==== Map and WeakMap ====
Modern JavaScript handles associative arrays, using the Map and WeakMap classes. A map does not contain any keys by default; it only contains what is explicitly put into it. The keys and values can be any type (including functions, objects, or any primitive).

===== Creation =====
A map can be initialized with all items during construction:

const phoneBook = new Map([
    ["Sally Smart", "555-9999"],
    ["John Doe", "555-1212"],
    ["J. Random Hacker", "553-1337"],
]);

With TypeScript generic annotations, this is:

const phoneBook = new Map<string, string>([
    ["Sally Smart", "555-9999"],
    ["John Doe", "555-1212"],
    ["J. Random Hacker", "553-1337"],
]);

Alternatively, an empty map can be initialized and then populated with items:

const phoneBook = new Map();
phoneBook.set("Sally Smart", "555-9999");
phoneBook.set("John Doe", "555-1212");
phoneBook.set("J. Random Hacker", "553-1337");

===== Access by key =====
Accessing an element of the map can be done with the get method:

const sallyNumber = phoneBook.get("Sally Smart");

In this example, the value sallyNumber will now contain the string "555-9999".

===== Enumeration =====
The keys in a map are ordered. Thus, when iterating through it, a map object returns keys in order of insertion. The following demonstrates enumeration using a for-loop:

// loop through the collection and display each entry.
for (const [name, number] of phoneBook) {
    console.log(`Phone number for ${name} is ${number}`);
}

A key can be removed as follows:

phoneBook.delete("Sally Smart");

==== Object ====
An object is similar to a map—both let you set keys to values, retrieve those values, delete keys, and detect whether a value is stored at a key. For this reason (and because there were no built-in alternatives), objects historically have been used as maps.

However, there are important differences that make a map preferable in certain cases. In JavaScript an object is a mapping from property names to values—that is, an associative array with one caveat: the keys of an object must be either a string or a symbol (native objects and primitives implicitly converted to a string keys are allowed). Objects also include one feature unrelated to associative arrays: an object has a prototype, so it contains default keys that could conflict with user-defined keys. So, doing a lookup for a property will point the lookup to the prototype's definition if the object does not define the property.

An object literal is written as { property1: value1, property2: value2, ... }. For example:

const myObject = {
    "Sally Smart": "555-9999",
    "John Doe": "555-1212",
    "J. Random Hacker": "553-1337",
};

To prevent the lookup from using the prototype's properties, you can use the Object.setPrototypeOf function:

Object.setPrototypeOf(myObject, null);

As of ECMAScript 5 (ES5), the prototype can also be bypassed by using Object.create(null):

const myObject = Object.create(null);

Object.assign(myObject, {
    "Sally Smart": "555-9999",
    "John Doe": "555-1212",
    "J. Random Hacker": "553-1337",
});

If the property name is a valid identifier, the quotes can be omitted, e.g.:

const myOtherObject = { foo: 42, bar: false };

Lookup is written using property-access notation, either square brackets, which always work, or dot notation, which only works for identifier keys:

myObject["John Doe"]
myOtherObject.foo

You can also loop through all enumerable properties and associated values as follows (a for-in loop):

for (const property in myObject) {
    const value = myObject[property];
    console.log(`myObject[${property}] = ${value}`);
}

Or (a for-of loop):

for (const [property, value] of Object.entries(myObject)) {
    console.log(`${property} = ${value}`);
}

A property can be removed as follows:

delete myObject["Sally Smart"];

As mentioned before, properties are strings and symbols. Since every native object and primitive can be implicitly converted to a string, you can do:

myObject[1]                                        // key is "1"; note that myObject[1] == myObject["1"]
myObject[["a", "b"]]                               // key is "a,b"
myObject[{ toString() { return "hello world"; } }] // key is "hello world"

In modern JavaScript it's considered bad form to use the Array type as an associative array. Consensus is that the Object type and Map/WeakMap classes are best for this purpose. The reasoning behind this is that if Array is extended via prototype and Object is kept pristine, for and for-in loops will work as expected on associative 'arrays'. This issue has been brought to the fore by the popularity of JavaScript frameworks that make heavy and sometimes indiscriminate use of prototypes to extend JavaScript's inbuilt types.

See JavaScript Array And Object Prototype Awareness Day for more information on the issue.

=== Julia ===
In Julia, the following operations manage associative arrays.

Declare dictionary:

phonebook = Dict( "Sally Smart" => "555-9999", "John Doe" => "555-1212", "J. Random Hacker" => "555-1337" )

Access element:

phonebook["Sally Smart"]

Add element:

phonebook["New Contact"] = "555-2222"

Delete element:

delete!(phonebook, "Sally Smart")

Get keys and values as iterables:

keys(phonebook)
values(phonebook)

=== KornShell 93, and compliant shells ===
In KornShell 93, and compliant shells (ksh93, bash4...), the following operations can be used with associative arrays.

Definition:

typeset -A phonebook; # ksh93; in bash4+, "typeset" is a synonym of the more preferred "declare", which works identically in this case
phonebook=(["Sally Smart"]="555-9999" ["John Doe"]="555-1212" ["[[J. Random Hacker]]"]="555-1337");

Dereference:

${phonebook["John Doe"]};

=== Lisp ===
Lisp was originally conceived as a "LISt Processing" language, and one of its most important data types is the linked list, which can be treated as an association list ("alist").

'(("Sally Smart" . "555-9999")
  ("John Doe" . "555-1212")
  ("J. Random Hacker" . "553-1337"))

The syntax (x . y) is used to indicate a consed pair. Keys and values need not be the same type within an alist. Lisp and Scheme provide operators such as assoc to manipulate alists in ways similar to associative arrays.

A set of operations specific to the handling of association lists exists for Common Lisp, each of these working non-destructively.

To add an entry the acons function is employed, creating and returning a new association list. An association list in Common Lisp mimicks a stack, that is, adheres to the last-in-first-out (LIFO) principle, and hence prepends to the list head.

(let ((phone-book NIL))
  (setf phone-book (acons "Sally Smart"      "555-9999" phone-book))
  (setf phone-book (acons "John Doe"         "555-1212" phone-book))
  (setf phone-book (acons "J. Random Hacker" "555-1337" phone-book)))

This function can be construed as an accommodation for cons operations.

;; The effect of
;;   (cons (cons KEY VALUE) ALIST)
;; is equivalent to
;;   (acons KEY VALUE ALIST)
(let ((phone-book '(("Sally Smart" . "555-9999") ("John Doe" . "555-1212"))))
  (cons (cons "J. Random Hacker" "555-1337") phone-book))

Of course, the destructive push operation also allows inserting entries into an association list, an entry having to constitute a key-value cons in order to retain the mapping's validity.

(push (cons "Dummy" "123-4567") phone-book)

Searching for an entry by its key is performed via assoc, which might be configured for the test predicate and direction, especially searching the association list from its end to its front. The result, if positive, returns the entire entry cons, not only its value. Failure to obtain a matching key leads to a return of the NIL value.

(assoc "John Doe" phone-book :test #'string=)

Two generalizations of assoc exist: assoc-if expects a predicate function that tests each entry's key, returning the first entry for which the predicate produces a non-NIL value upon invocation. assoc-if-not inverts the logic, accepting the same arguments, but returning the first entry generating NIL.

;; Find the first entry whose key equals "John Doe".
(assoc-if
  #'(lambda (key)
      (string= key "John Doe"))
  phone-book)

;; Finds the first entry whose key is neither "Sally Smart" nor "John Doe"
(assoc-if-not
  #'(lambda (key)
      (member key '("Sally Smart" "John Doe") :test #'string=))
  phone-book)

The inverse process, the detection of an entry by its value, utilizes rassoc.

;; Find the first entry with a value of "555-9999".
;; We test the entry string values with the "string=" predicate.
(rassoc "555-9999" phone-book :test #'string=)

The corresponding generalizations rassoc-if and rassoc-if-not exist.

;; Finds the first entry whose value is "555-9999".
(rassoc-if
  #'(lambda (value)
      (string= value "555-9999"))
  phone-book)

;; Finds the first entry whose value is not "555-9999".
(rassoc-if-not
  #'(lambda (value)
      (string= value "555-9999"))
  phone-book)

All of the previous entry search functions can be replaced by general list-centric variants, such as find, find-if, find-if-not, as well as pertinent functions like position and its derivates.

;; Find an entry with the key "John Doe" and the value "555-1212".
(find (cons "John Doe" "555-1212") phone-book :test #'equal)

Deletion, lacking a specific counterpart, is based upon the list facilities, including destructive ones.

;; Create and return an alist without any entry whose key equals "John Doe".
(remove-if
  #'(lambda (entry)
      (string= (car entry) "John Doe"))
  phone-book)

Iteration is accomplished with the aid of any function that expects a list.

;; Iterate via "map".
(map NIL
  #'(lambda (entry)
      (destructuring-bind (key . value) entry
        (format T "~&~s => ~s" key value)))
  phone-book)

;; Iterate via "dolist".
(dolist (entry phone-book)
  (destructuring-bind (key . value) entry
    (format T "~&~s => ~s" key value)))

These being structured lists, processing and transformation operations can be applied without constraints.

;; Return a vector of the "phone-book" values.
(map 'vector #'cdr phone-book)

;; Destructively modify the "phone-book" via "map-into".
(map-into phone-book
  #'(lambda (entry)
      (destructuring-bind (key . value) entry
        (cons (reverse key) (reverse value))))
  phone-book)

Because of their linear nature, alists are used for relatively small sets of data. Common Lisp also supports a hash table data type, and for Scheme they are implemented in SRFI 69. Hash tables have greater overhead than alists, but provide much faster access when there are many elements. A further characteristic is the fact that Common Lisp hash tables do not, as opposed to association lists, maintain the order of entry insertion.

Common Lisp hash tables are constructed via the make-hash-table function, whose arguments encompass, among other configurations, a predicate to test the entry key. While tolerating arbitrary objects, even heterogeneity within a single hash table instance, the specification of this key :test function is confined to distinguishable entities: the Common Lisp standard only mandates the support of eq, eql, equal, and equalp, yet designating additional or custom operations as permissive for concrete implementations.

(let ((phone-book (make-hash-table :test #'equal)))
  (setf (gethash "Sally Smart"      phone-book) "555-9999")
  (setf (gethash "John Doe"         phone-book) "555-1212")
  (setf (gethash "J. Random Hacker" phone-book) "553-1337"))

The gethash function permits obtaining the value associated with a key.

(gethash "John Doe" phone-book)

Additionally, a default value for the case of an absent key may be specified.

(gethash "Incognito" phone-book 'no-such-key)

An invocation of gethash actually returns two values: the value or substitute value for the key and a boolean indicator, returning T if the hash table contains the key and NIL to signal its absence.

(multiple-value-bind (value contains-key) (gethash "Sally Smart" phone-book)
  (if contains-key
    (format T "~&The associated value is: ~s" value)
    (format T "~&The key could not be found.")))

Use remhash for deleting the entry associated with a key.

(remhash "J. Random Hacker" phone-book)

clrhash completely empties the hash table.

(clrhash phone-book)

The dedicated maphash function specializes in iterating hash tables.

(maphash
  #'(lambda (key value)
      (format T "~&~s => ~s" key value))
  phone-book)

Alternatively, the loop construct makes provisions for iterations, through keys, values, or conjunctions of both.

;; Iterate the keys and values of the hash table.
(loop
  for   key being the hash-keys of phone-book
  using (hash-value value)
  do    (format T "~&~s => ~s" key value))

;; Iterate the values of the hash table.
(loop
  for value being the hash-values of phone-book
  do  (print value))

A further option invokes with-hash-table-iterator, an iterator-creating macro, the processing of which is intended to be driven by the caller.

(with-hash-table-iterator (entry-generator phone-book)
  (loop do
    (multiple-value-bind (has-entry key value) (entry-generator)
      (if has-entry
        (format T "~&~s => ~s" key value)
        (loop-finish)))))

It is easy to construct composite abstract data types in Lisp, using structures or object-oriented programming features, in conjunction with lists, arrays, and hash tables.

=== LPC ===
LPC implements associative arrays as a fundamental type known as either "map" or "mapping", depending on the driver. The keys and values can be of any type. A mapping literal is written as ([ key_1 : value_1, key_2 : value_2 ]). Procedural code looks like:

mapping phone_book = ([]);
phone_book["Sally Smart"] = "555-9999";
phone_book["John Doe"] = "555-1212";
phone_book["J. Random Hacker"] = "555-1337";

Mappings are accessed for reading using the indexing operator in the same way as they are for writing, as shown above. So phone_book["Sally Smart"] would return the string "555-9999", and phone_book["John Smith"] would return 0. Testing for presence is done using the function member(), e.g. if(member(phone_book, "John Smith")) write("John Smith is listed.\n");

Deletion is accomplished using a function called either m_delete() or map_delete(), depending on the driver: m_delete(phone_book, "Sally Smart");

LPC drivers of the Amylaar family implement multivalued mappings using a secondary, numeric index (other drivers of the MudOS family do not support multivalued mappings.) Example syntax:

mapping phone_book = ([:2]);
phone_book["Sally Smart", 0] = "555-9999";
phone_book["Sally Smart", 1] = "99 Sharp Way";
phone_book["John Doe", 0] = "555-1212";
phone_book["John Doe", 1] = "3 Nigma Drive";
phone_book["J. Random Hacker", 0] = "555-1337";
phone_book["J. Random Hacker", 1] = "77 Massachusetts Avenue";

LPC drivers modern enough to support a foreach() construct use it to iterate through their mapping types.

=== Lua ===
In Lua, "table" is a fundamental type that can be used either as an array (numerical index, fast) or as an associative array.

The keys and values can be of any type, except nil. The following focuses on non-numerical indexes.

A table literal is written as { value, key = value, [index] = value, ["non id string"] = value }. For example:

phone_book = {
	["Sally Smart"] = "555-9999", 
	["John Doe"] = "555-1212", 
	["J. Random Hacker"] = "553-1337", -- Trailing comma is OK
}

aTable = {
	-- Table as value
	subTable = { 5, 7.5, k = true }, -- key is "subTable"
	-- Function as value
	['John Doe'] = function (age) if age < 18 then return "Young" else return "Old!" end end,
	-- Table and function (and other types) can also be used as keys
}

If the key is a valid identifier (not a reserved word), the quotes can be omitted. Identifiers are case sensitive.

Lookup is written using either square brackets, which always works, or dot notation, which only works for identifier keys:

print(aTable["John Doe"](45))
x = aTable.subTable.k

You can also loop through all keys and associated values with iterators or for-loops:

simple = { [true] = 1, [false] = 0, [3.14] = math.pi, x = 'x', ["!"] = 42 }
function FormatElement(key, value)
	return "[" .. tostring(key) .. "] = " .. value .. ", "
end
-- Iterate on all keys
table.foreach(simple, function (k, v) io.write(FormatElement(k, v)) end)
print""
for k, v in pairs(simple) do io.write(FormatElement(k, v)) end
print""
k= nil
repeat
	k, v = next(simple, k)
	if k ~= nil then io.write(FormatElement(k, v)) end
until k == nil
print""

An entry can be removed by setting it to nil:

simple.x = nil

Likewise, you can overwrite values or add them:

simple['%'] = "percent"
simple['!'] = 111

=== Mathematica and Wolfram Language ===
Mathematica and Wolfram Language use the Association expression to represent associative arrays.

phonebook = <| "Sally Smart" -> "555-9999", 
               "John Doe" -> "555-1212",
               "J. Random Hacker" -> "553-1337" |>;

To access:

phonebook[[Key["Sally Smart"]]]

If the keys are strings, the Key keyword is not necessary, so:

phonebook[["Sally Smart"]]

To list keys: and values

Keys[phonebook]
Values[phonebook]

=== MUMPS ===
In MUMPS every array is an associative array. The built-in, language-level, direct support for associative arrays applies to private, process-specific arrays stored in memory called "locals" as well as to the permanent, shared, global arrays stored on disk which are available concurrently to multiple jobs. The name for globals is preceded by the circumflex "^" to distinguish them from local variables.

SET ^phonebook("Sally Smart")="555-9999"      ;; storing permanent data
SET phonebook("John Doe")="555-1212"          ;; storing temporary data
SET phonebook("J. Random Hacker")="553-1337"  ;; storing temporary data
MERGE ^phonebook=phonebook                    ;; copying temporary data into permanent data

Accessing the value of an element simply requires using the name with the subscript:

WRITE "Phone Number :",^phonebook("Sally Smart"),!

You can also loop through an associated array as follows:

SET NAME=""
FOR  S NAME=$ORDER(^phonebook(NAME)) QUIT:NAME=""  WRITE NAME,"  Phone Number :",^phonebook(NAME),!

=== Objective-C (Cocoa/GNUstep) ===
Cocoa and GNUstep, written in Objective-C, handle associative arrays using NSMutableDictionary (a mutable version of NSDictionary) class cluster. This class allows assignments between any two objects. A copy of the key object is made before it is inserted into NSMutableDictionary, therefore the keys must conform to the NSCopying protocol. When being inserted to a dictionary, the value object receives a retain message to increase its reference count. The value object will receive the release message when it will be deleted from the dictionary (either explicitly or by adding to the dictionary a different object with the same key).

NSMutableDictionary *aDictionary = [[NSMutableDictionary alloc] init];
[aDictionary setObject:@"555-9999" forKey:@"Sally Smart"]; 
[aDictionary setObject:@"555-1212" forKey:@"John Doe"]; 
[aDictionary setObject:@"553-1337" forKey:@"Random Hacker"];

To access assigned objects, this command may be used:

id anObject = [aDictionary objectForKey:@"Sally Smart"];

All keys or values can be enumerated using NSEnumerator:

NSEnumerator *keyEnumerator = [aDictionary keyEnumerator];
id key;
while ((key = [keyEnumerator nextObject]))
{
  // ... process it here ...
}

In Mac OS X 10.5+ and iPhone OS, dictionary keys can be enumerated more concisely using the NSFastEnumeration construct:

for (id key in aDictionary) {
  // ... process it here ...
}

What is even more practical, structured data graphs may be easily created using Cocoa, especially NSDictionary (NSMutableDictionary). This can be illustrated with this compact example:

NSDictionary *aDictionary =
       [NSDictionary dictionaryWithObjectsAndKeys:
                           [NSDictionary dictionaryWithObjectsAndKeys:
                                   @"555-9999", @"Sally Smart",
                                   @"555-1212", @"John Doe",
                                   nil], @"students",
                           [NSDictionary dictionaryWithObjectsAndKeys:
                                   @"553-1337", @"Random Hacker",
                                   nil], @"hackers",
                           nil];

Relevant fields can be quickly accessed using key paths:

id anObject = [aDictionary valueForKeyPath:@"students.Sally Smart"];

=== OCaml ===
The OCaml programming language provides three different associative containers. The simplest is a list of pairs:

# let m = [
	"Sally Smart", "555-9999";
	"John Doe", "555-1212";
	"J. Random Hacker", "553-1337"];;
val m : (string * string) list = [
	("Sally Smart", "555-9999");
	("John Doe", "555-1212");
	("J. Random Hacker", "553-1337")
]
# List.assoc "John Doe" m;;
- : string = "555-1212"

The second is a polymorphic hash table:

# let m = Hashtbl.create 3;;
val m : ('_a, '_b) Hashtbl.t = <abstr>
# Hashtbl.add m "Sally Smart" "555-9999";
  Hashtbl.add m "John Doe" "555-1212";
  Hashtbl.add m "J. Random Hacker" "553-1337";;
- : unit = ()
# Hashtbl.find m "John Doe";;
- : string = "555-1212"

The code above uses OCaml's default hash function Hashtbl.hash, which is defined automatically for all types. To use a modified hash function, use the functor interface Hashtbl.Make to create a module, such as with Map.

Finally, functional maps (represented as immutable balanced binary trees):

# module StringMap = Map.Make(String);;
...
# let m = StringMap.add "Sally Smart" "555-9999" StringMap.empty
  let m = StringMap.add "John Doe" "555-1212" m
  let m = StringMap.add "J. Random Hacker" "553-1337" m;;
val m : string StringMap.t = <abstr>
# StringMap.find "John Doe" m;;
 - : string = "555-1212"

Note that in order to use Map, you have to provide the functor Map.Make with a module which defines the key type and the comparison function. The third-party library ExtLib provides a polymorphic version of functional maps, called PMap, which is given a comparison function upon creation.

Lists of pairs and functional maps both provide a purely functional interface. By contrast, hash tables provide an imperative interface. For many operations, hash tables are significantly faster than lists of pairs and functional maps.

=== OptimJ ===
The OptimJ programming language is an extension of Java 5. As does Java, Optimj provides maps; but OptimJ also provides true associative arrays. Java arrays are indexed with non-negative integers; associative arrays are indexed with any type of key.

String[String] phoneBook = {
  "Sally Smart"      -> "555-9999",
  "John Doe"         -> "555-1212",
  "J. Random Hacker" -> "553-1337"
};

// String[String] is not a java type but an optimj type:
// associative array of strings indexed by strings.

// iterate over the values
for (String number : phoneBook) {
  System.out.println(number);
}

// The previous statement prints:  "555-9999" "555-1212" "553-1337"

// iterate over the keys
for (String name : phoneBook.keys) {
  System.out.println(name + " -> " + phoneBook[name]);
}
// phoneBook[name] access a value by a key (it looks like java array access)
// i.e. phoneBook["John Doe"] returns "555-1212"

Of course, it is possible to define multi-dimensional arrays, to mix Java arrays and associative arrays, to mix maps and associative arrays.

int[String][][double] a;
java.util.Map<String[Object], Integer> b;

=== Perl 5 ===
Perl 5 has built-in, language-level support for associative arrays. Modern Perl refers to associative arrays as hashes; the term associative array is found in older documentation but is considered somewhat archaic. Perl 5 hashes are flat: keys are strings and values are scalars. However, values may be references to arrays or other hashes, and the standard Perl 5 module Tie::RefHash enables hashes to be used with reference keys.

A hash variable is marked by a % sigil, to distinguish it from scalar, array, and other data types. A hash literal is a key-value list, with the preferred form using Perl's => token, which is semantically mostly identical to the comma and makes the key-value association clearer:

my %phone_book = (
	'Sally Smart'      => '555-9999',
	'John Doe'         => '555-1212',
	'J. Random Hacker' => '553-1337',
);

Accessing a hash element uses the syntax $hash_name{$key} – the key is surrounded by curly braces and the hash name is prefixed by a $, indicating that the hash element itself is a scalar value, even though it is part of a hash. The value of $phone_book{'John Doe'} is '555-1212'. The % sigil is only used when referring to the hash as a whole, such as when asking for keys %phone_book.

The list of keys and values can be extracted using the built-in functions keys and values, respectively. So, for example, to print all the keys of a hash:

foreach $name (keys %phone_book) {
	print $name, "\n";
}

One can iterate through (key, value) pairs using the each function:

while (($name, $number) = each %phone_book) {
	print 'Number for ', $name, ': ', $number, "\n";
}

A hash "reference", which is a scalar value that points to a hash, is specified in literal form using curly braces as delimiters, with syntax otherwise similar to specifying a hash literal:

my $phone_book = {
	'Sally Smart' => '555-9999',
	'John Doe' => '555-1212',
	'J. Random Hacker' => '553-1337',
};

Values in a hash reference are accessed using the dereferencing operator:

print $phone_book->{'Sally Smart'};

When the hash contained in the hash reference needs to be referred to as a whole, as with the keys function, the syntax is as follows:

foreach $name (keys %{$phone_book}) {
	print 'Number for ', $name, ': ', $phone_book->{$name}, "\n";
}

=== Perl 6 (Raku) ===
Perl 6, renamed as "Raku", also has built-in, language-level support for associative arrays, which are referred to as hashes or as objects performing the "associative" role. As in Perl 5, Perl 6 default hashes are flat: keys are strings and values are scalars. One can define a hash to not coerce all keys to strings automatically: these are referred to as "object hashes", because the keys of such hashes remain the original object rather than a stringification thereof.

A hash variable is typically marked by a % sigil, to visually distinguish it from scalar, array, and other data types, and to define its behaviour towards iteration. A hash literal is a key-value list, with the preferred form using Perl's => token, which makes the key-value association clearer:

my %phone-book =
	'Sally Smart'      => '555-9999',
	'John Doe'         => '555-1212',
	'J. Random Hacker' => '553-1337',
;

Accessing a hash element uses the syntax %hash_name{$key} – the key is surrounded by curly braces and the hash name (note that the sigil does not change, contrary to Perl 5). The value of %phone-book{'John Doe'} is '555-1212'.

The list of keys and values can be extracted using the built-in functions keys and values, respectively. So, for example, to print all the keys of a hash:

for %phone-book.keys -> $name {
	say $name;
}

By default, when iterating through a hash, one gets key–value pairs.

for %phone-book -> $entry {
	say "Number for $entry.key(): $entry.value()";  # using extended interpolation features
}

It is also possible to get alternating key values and value values by using the kv method:

for %phone-book.kv -> $name, $number {
	say "Number for $name: $number";
}

Raku doesn't have any references. Hashes can be passed as single parameters that are not flattened. If you want to make sure that a subroutine only accepts hashes, use the % sigil in the Signature.

sub list-phone-book(%pb) {
    for %pb.kv -> $name, $number {
        say "Number for $name: $number";
    }
}
list-phone-book(%phone-book);

In compliance with gradual typing, hashes may be subjected to type constraints, confining a set of valid keys to a certain type.

# Define a hash whose keys may only be integer numbers ("Int" type).
my %numbersWithNames{Int};

# Keys must be integer numbers, as in this case.
%numbersWithNames.push(1 => "one");

# This will cause an error, as strings as keys are invalid.
%numbersWithNames.push("key" => "two");

=== PHP ===
PHP's built-in array type is, in reality, an associative array. Even when using numerical indexes, PHP internally stores arrays as associative arrays. So, PHP can have non-consecutively numerically indexed arrays. The keys have to be of integer (floating point numbers are truncated to integer) or string type, while values can be of arbitrary types, including other arrays and objects. The arrays are heterogeneous: a single array can have keys of different types. PHP's associative arrays can be used to represent trees, lists, stacks, queues, and other common data structures not built into PHP.

An associative array can be declared using the following syntax:

$phonebook                     = array();
$phonebook['Sally Smart']      = '555-9999';
$phonebook['John Doe']         = '555-1212';
$phonebook['J. Random Hacker'] = '555-1337';

// or

$phonebook = array(
    'Sally Smart'      => '555-9999',
    'John Doe'         => '555-1212',
    'J. Random Hacker' => '555-1337',
);

// or, as of PHP 5.4

$phonebook = [
    'Sally Smart'      => '555-9999',
    'John Doe'         => '555-1212',
    'J. Random Hacker' => '555-1337',
];

// or

$phonebook['contacts']['Sally Smart']['number']      = '555-9999';
$phonebook['contacts']['John Doe']['number']         = '555-1212';
$phonebook['contacts']['J. Random Hacker']['number'] = '555-1337';

PHP can loop through an associative array as follows:

foreach ($phonebook as $name => $number) {
    echo 'Number for ', $name, ': ', $number, "\n";
}

// For the last array example it is used like this
foreach ($phonebook['contacts'] as $name => $num) {
   echo 'Name: ', $name, ', number: ', $num['number'], "\n";
}

PHP has an extensive set of functions to operate on arrays.

Associative arrays that can use objects as keys, instead of strings and integers, can be implemented with the SplObjectStorage class from the Standard PHP Library (SPL).

=== Pike ===
Pike has built-in support for associative arrays, which are referred to as mappings. Mappings are created as follows:

mapping(string:string) phonebook = ([
	"Sally Smart":"555-9999",
	"John Doe":"555-1212",
	"J. Random Hacker":"555-1337"
]);

Accessing and testing for presence in mappings is done using the indexing operator. So phonebook["Sally Smart"] would return the string "555-9999", and phonebook["John Smith"] would return 0.

Iterating through a mapping can be done using foreach:

foreach(phonebook; string key; string value) {
	write("%s:%s\n", key, value);
}

Or using an iterator object:

Mapping.Iterator i = get_iterator(phonebook);
while (i->index()) {
	write("%s:%s\n", i->index(), i->value());
	i->next();
}

Elements of a mapping can be removed using m_delete, which returns the value of the removed index:

string sallys_number = m_delete(phonebook, "Sally Smart");

=== PostScript ===
In PostScript, associative arrays are called dictionaries. In Level 1 PostScript they must be created explicitly, but Level 2 introduced direct declaration using a double-angled-bracket syntax:

  % Level 1 declaration
  3 dict dup begin
    /red   (rouge) def
    /green (vert)  def
    /blue  (bleu)  def
  end

  % Level 2 declaration
  <<
    /red   (rot)
    /green (gruen)
    /blue  (blau)
  >>

  % Both methods leave the dictionary on the operand stack

Dictionaries can be accessed directly, using get, or implicitly, by placing the dictionary on the dictionary stack using begin:

  % With the previous two dictionaries still on the operand stack
  /red get print    % outputs 'rot'

  begin
  green print       % outputs 'vert'
  end

Dictionary contents can be iterated through using forall, though not in any particular order:

  % Level 2 example
  <<
    /This  1
    /That  2
    /Other 3
  >> {exch =print ( is ) print ==} forall

Which may output:

  That is 2
  This is 1
  Other is 3

Dictionaries can be augmented (up to their defined size only in Level 1) or altered using put, and entries can be removed using undef:

  % define a dictionary for easy reuse:
  /MyDict <<
    /rouge (red)
    /vert (gruen)
  >> def

  % add to it
  MyDict /bleu (blue) put

  % change it
  MyDict /vert (green) put

  % remove something
  MyDict /rouge undef

=== Prolog ===
Some versions of Prolog include dictionary ("dict") utilities.

=== Python ===
In Python, associative arrays are called "dictionaries". Dictionary literals are delimited by curly braces:

from typing import Any

phonebook: dict[str, str] = {
    "Sally Smart": "555-9999",
    "John Doe": "555-1212",
    "J. Random Hacker": "553-1337",
}

Dictionary items can be accessed using the array indexing operator:

print(phonebook["Sally Smart"])
# prints '555-9999'

Loop iterating through all the keys of the dictionary:

for key in phonebook:
    print(key, phonebook[key])

# prints:
# Sally Smart 555-9999
# J. Random Hacker 553-1337
# John Doe 555-1212

Iterating through (key, value) tuples:

for key, value in phonebook.items():
    print(key, value)

# prints:
# Sally Smart 555-9999
# J. Random Hacker 553-1337
# John Doe 555-1212

Dictionary keys can be individually deleted using the del statement. The corresponding value can be returned before the key-value pair is deleted using the "pop" method of "dict" type:

del phonebook["John Doe"]
val = phonebook.pop("Sally Smart")
print(phonebook.keys())  # Only one key left
# prints ['J. Random Hacker']

Python 2.7 and 3.x also support dict comprehensions (similar to list comprehensions), a compact syntax for generating a dictionary from any iterator:

square_dict: dict[int, int] = {i: i*i for i in range(5)}
print(square_dict)
# prints {0: 0, 1: 1, 2: 4, 3: 9, 4: 16}
print({key: value for key, value in phonebook.items() if "J" in key})
# prints {'J. Random Hacker': '553-1337', 'John Doe': '555-1212'}

Strictly speaking, a dictionary is a super-set of an associative array, since neither the keys or values are limited to a single datatype. One could think of a dictionary as an "associative list" using the nomenclature of Python. For example, the following is also legitimate:

phonebook: dict[Any, Any] = {
    "Sally Smart": "555-9999",
    "John Doe": None,
    "J. Random Hacker": -3.32,
    14: "555-3322",
}

The dictionary keys must be of an immutable data type. In Python, strings are immutable due to their method of implementation.

=== Red ===
In Red the built-in map! datatype provides an associative array that maps values of word, string, and scalar key types to values of any type. A hash table is used internally for lookup.

A map can be written as a literal, such as #(key1 value1 key2 value2 ...), or can be created using make map! [key1 value1 key2 value2 ...]:

Red [Title:"My map"]

my-map: make map! [
    "Sally Smart"      "555-9999"
    "John Doe"         "555-1212"
    "J. Random Hacker" "553-1337"
]

; Red preserves case for both keys and values, however lookups are case insensitive by default; it is possible to force case sensitivity using the <code>/case</code> refinement for <code>select</code> and <code>put</code>.

; It is of course possible to use <code>word!</code> values as keys, in which case it is generally preferred to use <code>set-word!</code> values when creating the map, but any word type can be used for lookup or creation.

my-other-map: make map! [foo: 42 bar: false]

; Notice that the block is not reduced or evaluated in any way, therefore in the above example the key <code>bar</code> is associated with the <code>word!</code> <code>false</code> rather than the <code>logic!</code> value false; literal syntax can be used if the latter is desired:

my-other-map: make map! [foo: 42 bar: #[false]]

; or keys can be added after creation:

my-other-map: make map! [foo: 42]
my-other-map/bar: false

; Lookup can be written using <code>path!</code> notation or using the <code>select</code> action:

select my-map "Sally Smart"
my-other-map/foo

; You can also loop through all keys and values with <code>foreach</code>:

foreach [key value] my-map [
    print [key "is associated to" value]
]

; A key can be removed using <code>remove/key</code>:

remove/key my-map "Sally Smart"

=== REXX ===
In REXX, associative arrays are called "stem variables" or "Compound variables".

KEY = 'Sally Smart'
PHONEBOOK.KEY = '555-9999'
KEY = 'John Doe'
PHONEBOOK.KEY = '555-1212'
KEY = 'J. Random Hacker'
PHONEBOOK.KEY = '553-1337'

Stem variables with numeric keys typically start at 1 and go up from there. The 0-key stem variable by convention contains the total number of items in the stem:

NAME.1 = 'Sally Smart'
NAME.2 = 'John Doe'
NAME.3 = 'J. Random Hacker'
NAME.0 = 3

REXX has no easy way of automatically accessing the keys of a stem variable; and typically the keys are stored in a separate associative array, with numeric keys.

=== Ruby ===
In Ruby a hash table is used as follows:

phonebook = {
  'Sally Smart' => '555-9999',
  'John Doe' => '555-1212',
  'J. Random Hacker' => '553-1337'
}
phonebook['John Doe']

Ruby supports hash looping and iteration with the following syntax:

irb(main):007:0> ### iterate over keys and values
irb(main):008:0* phonebook.each {|key, value| puts key + " => " + value}
Sally Smart => 555-9999
John Doe => 555-1212
J. Random Hacker => 553-1337
=> {"Sally Smart"=>"555-9999", "John Doe"=>"555-1212", "J. Random Hacker"=>"553-1337"}
irb(main):009:0> ### iterate keys only
irb(main):010:0* phonebook.each_key {|key| puts key}
Sally Smart
John Doe
J. Random Hacker
=> {"Sally Smart"=>"555-9999", "John Doe"=>"555-1212", "J. Random Hacker"=>"553-1337"}
irb(main):011:0> ### iterate values only
irb(main):012:0* phonebook.each_value {|value| puts value}
555-9999
555-1212
553-1337
=> {"Sally Smart"=>"555-9999", "John Doe"=>"555-1212", "J. Random Hacker"=>"553-1337"}

Ruby also supports many other useful operations on hashes, such as merging hashes, selecting or rejecting elements that meet some criteria, inverting (swapping the keys and values), and flattening a hash into an array.

=== Rust ===
The Rust standard library provides a hash map (std::collections::HashMap) and a B-tree map (std::collections::BTreeMap). They share several methods with the same names, but have different requirements for the types of keys that can be inserted. The HashMap requires keys to implement the Eq (equivalence relation) and Hash (hashability) traits and it stores entries in an unspecified order, and the BTreeMap requires the Ord (total order) trait for its keys and it stores entries in an order defined by the key type. The order is reflected by the default iterators.

use std::collections::HashMap;

let mut phone_book: HashMap<String, String> = HashMap::new();
phone_book.insert("Sally Smart", "555-9999");
phone_book.insert("John Doe", "555-1212");
phone_book.insert("J. Random Hacker", "555-1337");

// alternatively:
let phone_book: HashMap<String, String> = hash_map! {
    "Sally Smart" => "555-9999",
    "John Doe" => "555-1212",
    "J. Random Hacker" => "555-1337",
};

The default iterators visit all entries as tuples. The HashMap iterators visit entries in an unspecified order and the BTreeMap iterator visits entries in the order defined by the key type.

for (name, number) in &phone_book {
    println!("{} = {}", name, number);
}

There is also an iterator for keys:

for name in phone_book.keys() {
    println!("{}", name);
}

=== S-Lang ===
S-Lang has an associative array type:

phonebook = Assoc_Type[];
phonebook["Sally Smart"] = "555-9999"
phonebook["John Doe"] = "555-1212"
phonebook["J. Random Hacker"] = "555-1337"

You can also loop through an associated array in a number of ways:

foreach name (phonebook) {
	vmessage ("%s %s", name, phonebook[name]);
}

To print a sorted-list, it is better to take advantage of S-lang's strong support for standard arrays:

keys = assoc_get_keys(phonebook);
i = array_sort(keys);
vals = assoc_get_values(phonebook);
array_map (Void_Type, &vmessage, "%s %s", keys[i], vals[i]);

=== Scala ===
Scala provides an immutable Map class as part of the scala.collection framework:

val phonebook = Map("Sally Smart" -> "555-9999",
  "John Doe" -> "555-1212",
  "J. Random Hacker" -> "553-1337")

Scala's type inference will decide that this is a Map[String, String]. To access the array:

phonebook.get("Sally Smart")

This returns an Option type, Scala's equivalent of the Maybe monad in Haskell.

=== Smalltalk ===
In Smalltalk a Dictionary is used:

phonebook := Dictionary new.
phonebook at: 'Sally Smart' put: '555-9999'.
phonebook at: 'John Doe' put: '555-1212'.
phonebook at: 'J. Random Hacker' put: '553-1337'.

To access an entry the message #at: is sent to the dictionary object:

phonebook at: 'Sally Smart'

Which gives:

 '555-9999'

A dictionary hashes, or compares, based on equality and marks both key and value as strong references. Variants exist in which hash/compare on identity (IdentityDictionary) or keep weak references (WeakKeyDictionary / WeakValueDictionary). Because every object implements #hash, any object can be used as key (and of course also as value).

=== SNOBOL ===
SNOBOL is one of the first (if not the first) programming languages to use associative arrays. Associative arrays in SNOBOL are called Tables.

PHONEBOOK = TABLE()
PHONEBOOK['Sally Smart'] = '555-9999'
PHONEBOOK['John Doe'] = '555-1212'
PHONEBOOK['J. Random Hacker'] = '553-1337'

=== Standard ML ===
The SML'97 standard of the Standard ML programming language does not provide any associative containers. However, various implementations of Standard ML do provide associative containers.

The library of the popular Standard ML of New Jersey (SML/NJ) implementation provides a signature (somewhat like an "interface"), ORD_MAP, which defines a common interface for ordered functional (immutable) associative arrays. There are several general functors—BinaryMapFn, ListMapFn, RedBlackMapFn, and SplayMapFn—that allow you to create the corresponding type of ordered map (the types are a self-balancing binary search tree, sorted association list, red–black tree, and splay tree, respectively) using a user-provided structure to describe the key type and comparator. The functor returns a structure in accordance with the ORD_MAP interface. In addition, there are two pre-defined modules for associative arrays that employ integer keys: IntBinaryMap and IntListMap.

- structure StringMap = BinaryMapFn (struct
                                       type ord_key = string
                                       val compare = String.compare
                                     end);
structure StringMap : ORD_MAP

- val m = StringMap.insert (StringMap.empty, "Sally Smart", "555-9999")
  val m = StringMap.insert (m, "John Doe", "555-1212")
  val m = StringMap.insert (m, "J. Random Hacker", "553-1337");
val m =
  T
    {cnt=3,key="John Doe",
     left=T {cnt=1,key="J. Random Hacker",left=E,right=E,value="553-1337"},
     right=T {cnt=1,key="Sally Smart",left=E,right=E,value="555-9999"},
     value="555-1212"} : string StringMap.map
- StringMap.find (m, "John Doe");
val it = SOME "555-1212" : string option

SML/NJ also provides a polymorphic hash table:

- exception NotFound;
exception NotFound
- val m : (string, string) HashTable.hash_table = HashTable.mkTable (HashString.hashString, op=) (3, NotFound);
val m =
  HT
    {eq_pred=fn,hash_fn=fn,n_items=ref 0,not_found=NotFound(-),
     table=ref [|NIL,NIL,NIL,NIL,NIL,NIL,NIL,NIL,NIL,NIL,NIL,NIL,...|]}
  : (string,string) HashTable.hash_table
- HashTable.insert m ("Sally Smart", "555-9999");
val it = () : unit
- HashTable.insert m ("John Doe", "555-1212");
val it = () : unit
- HashTable.insert m ("J. Random Hacker", "553-1337");
val it = () : unit
HashTable.find m "John Doe"; (* returns NONE if not found *)
val it = SOME "555-1212" : string option
- HashTable.lookup m "John Doe"; (* raises the exception if not found *)
val it = "555-1212" : string

Monomorphic hash tables are also supported, using the HashTableFn functor.

Another Standard ML implementation, Moscow ML, also provides some associative containers. First, it provides polymorphic hash tables in the Polyhash structure. Also, some functional maps from the SML/NJ library above are available as Binarymap, Splaymap, and Intmap structures.

=== Tcl ===
There are two Tcl facilities that support associative-array semantics. An "array" is a collection of variables. A "dict" is a full implementation of associative arrays.

==== array ====
set {phonebook(Sally Smart)} 555-9999
set john {John Doe}
set phonebook($john) 555-1212
set {phonebook(J. Random Hacker)} 553-1337

If there is a space character in the variable name, the name must be grouped using either curly brackets (no substitution performed) or double quotes (substitution is performed).

Alternatively, several array elements can be set by a single command, by presenting their mappings as a list (words containing whitespace are braced):

array set phonebook [list {Sally Smart} 555-9999 {John Doe} 555-1212 {J. Random Hacker} 553-1337]

To access one array entry and put it to standard output:

puts $phonebook(Sally\ Smart)

Which returns this result:

555-9999

To retrieve the entire array as a dictionary:

array get phonebook

The result can be (order of keys is unspecified, not because the dictionary is unordered, but because the array is):

{Sally Smart} 555-9999 {J. Random Hacker} 553-1337 {John Doe} 555-1212

==== dict ====
set phonebook [dict create {Sally Smart} 555-9999 {John Doe} 555-1212 {J. Random Hacker} 553-1337]

To look up an item:

dict get $phonebook {John Doe}

To iterate through a dict:

foreach {name number} $phonebook {
	puts "name: $name\nnumber: $number"
}

=== Visual Basic ===
Visual Basic can use the Dictionary class from the Microsoft Scripting Runtime (which is shipped with Visual Basic 6). There is no standard implementation common to all versions:

' Requires a reference to SCRRUN.DLL in Project Properties
Dim phoneBook As New Dictionary
phoneBook.Add "Sally Smart", "555-9999"
phoneBook.Item("John Doe") = "555-1212"
phoneBook("J. Random Hacker") = "553-1337"
For Each name In phoneBook
	MsgBox name & " = " & phoneBook(name)
Next

=== Visual Basic .NET ===
Visual Basic .NET uses the collection classes provided by the .NET Framework.

==== Creation ====
The following code demonstrates the creation and population of a dictionary (see the C# example on this page for additional information):

Dim dic As New System.Collections.Generic.Dictionary(Of String, String)
dic.Add("Sally Smart", "555-9999")
dic("John Doe") = "555-1212"
dic.Item("J. Random Hacker") = "553-1337"

An alternate syntax would be to use a collection initializer, which compiles down to individual calls to Add:

Dim dic As New System.Collections.Dictionary(Of String, String) From {
    {"Sally Smart", "555-9999"},
    {"John Doe", "555-1212"},
    {"J. Random Hacker", "553-1337"}
}

==== Access by key ====
Example demonstrating access (see C# access):

Dim sallyNumber = dic("Sally Smart")
' or
Dim sallyNumber = dic.Item("Sally Smart")

Dim result As String = Nothing
Dim sallyNumber = If(dic.TryGetValue("Sally Smart", result), result, "n/a")

==== Enumeration ====
Example demonstrating enumeration (see #C# enumeration):

' loop through the collection and display each entry.
For Each kvp As KeyValuePair(Of String, String) In dic
    Console.WriteLine("Phone number for {0} is {1}", kvp.Key, kvp.Value)
Next

=== Windows PowerShell ===
Unlike many other command line interpreters, Windows PowerShell has built-in, language-level support for defining associative arrays:

$phonebook = @{
        'Sally Smart' = '555-9999';
	'John Doe' = '555-1212'; 
	'J. Random Hacker' = '553-1337'
}

As in JavaScript, if the property name is a valid identifier, the quotes can be omitted:

$myOtherObject = @{ foo = 42; bar = $false }

Entries can be separated by either a semicolon or a newline:

$myOtherObject = @{ foo = 42
                    bar = $false ;
                    zaz = 3
}

Keys and values can be any .NET object type:

$now = [DateTime]::Now
$tomorrow = $now.AddDays(1)
$ProcessDeletionSchedule = @{ 
        (Get-Process notepad) = $now 
        (Get-Process calc) = $tomorrow
}

It is also possible to create an empty associative array and add single entries, or even other associative arrays, to it later on:

$phonebook = @{}
$phonebook += @{ 'Sally Smart' = '555-9999' }
$phonebook += @{ 'John Doe' = '555-1212'; 'J. Random Hacker' = '553-1337' }

New entries can also be added by using the array index operator, the property operator, or the Add() method of the underlying .NET object:

$phonebook = @{}
$phonebook['Sally Smart'] = '555-9999'
$phonebook.'John Doe' = '555-1212'
$phonebook.Add('J. Random Hacker', '553-1337')

To dereference assigned objects, the array index operator, the property operator, or the parameterized property Item() of the .NET object can be used:

$phonebook['Sally Smart'] 
$phonebook.'John Doe'
$phonebook.Item('J. Random Hacker')

You can loop through an associative array as follows:

$phonebook.Keys | foreach { "Number for {0}: {1}" -f $_,$phonebook.$_ }

An entry can be removed using the Remove() method of the underlying .NET object:

$phonebook.Remove('Sally Smart')

Hash tables can be added:

$hash1 = @{ a=1; b=2 }
$hash2 = @{ c=3; d=4 }
$hash3 = $hash1 + $hash2

== Data serialization formats support ==
Many data serialization formats also support associative arrays (see this table)

=== JSON ===
In JSON, associative arrays are also referred to as objects. Keys can only be strings.

{
    "Sally Smart": "555-9999",
    "John Doe": "555-1212",
    "J. Random Hacker": "555-1337"
}

=== TOML ===
TOML is designed to map directly to a hash map. TOML refers to associative arrays as tables. Tables within TOML can be expressed in either an "unfolded" or an inline approach. Keys can only be strings.

[phonebook]
"Sally Smart" = "555-9999"
"John Doe" = "555-1212"
"J. Random Hacker" = "555-1337"

phonebook = { "Sally Smart" = "555-9999", "John Doe" = "555-1212", "J. Random Hacker" = "555-1337" }

=== YAML ===
YAML associative arrays are also called map elements or key-value pairs. YAML places no restrictions on the types of keys; in particular, they are not restricted to being scalar or string values.

Sally Smart: 555-9999
John Doe: 555-1212
J. Random Hacker: 555-1337
