= Benoît Minisini =

French programmer (born 1972)

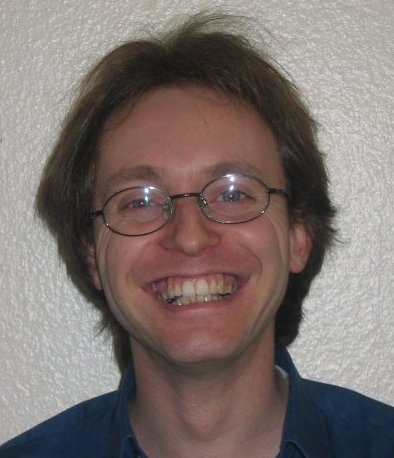
- Minisini at the 2005 Open Source World Conference
- Born: 1972 (age 52–53)
- Occupation: Computer programmer
- Known for: Gambas

Benoît Minisini is a French programmer best known for programming the Gambas graphical development environment. Starting programming when he was twelve, he became interested in writing languages, compilers, assemblers, and interpreters.

This interest and a respect for the BASIC programming language caused him to create Gambas, which is inspired by Visual Basic. Benoît has said that he intended Gambas to have the best features of Visual Basic, without the numerous bugs and flaws he sees in the program and the language. Benoît has a part-time software job, studied at École Pour l'Informatique et les Techniques Avancées and lives in Paris, France.

== See also ==
- Gambas
