= Earl A. Pace Jr. =

American businessman

- Died: February 19, 2022 (aged 78–79)
- Other name: Earl Pace Jr.
- Education: Pennsylvania State University, Temple University
- Occupations: Businessman, computer scientist, activist
- Known for: Co-founder of Black Data Processing Associates

Earl A. Pace Jr. was an American businessman, computer scientist, and activist. He was the co-founder of Black Data Processing Associates (BDPA) in 1975.

== Career ==
Earl A. Pace Jr. was a graduate of Pennsylvania State University, and pursued graduate studies at Temple University in Philadelphia. Pace began his career in information technology as a computer programmer trainee at the Pennsylvania Railroad (PRR) in 1965, where he remained until 1967.

Over the next ten years, he worked as a programmer, programmer analyst, programming manager and as vice president of a financial telecommunications company in Philadelphia, Pennsylvania. In 1976, he incorporated Pace Data Systems, of which served as president. Pace Data Systems, Inc. is a full-service information technology firm providing services through its Philadelphia, Pennsylvania, and Washington, D.C. offices, primarily to banks.

In 1975, he co-founded Black Data Processing Associates in Philadelphia and operated as its president for two years. In 1978, he coordinated the formation of BDPA into a national organization and served as its first national president until 1980. Black Data Processing Associates has grown into the largest national professional organization representing blacks in the information technology industry.

Pace was active in the business and education communities of Philadelphia, Washington, Baltimore, and other cities, where he makes presentations on topics of interest to IT professionals.

== Awards ==
In 1997, he received the National Technical Association's National Technical Achiever Award as Computer Scientist of the Year.

In 2001 and 2002, Black Money magazine named him as one of the 50 Most Influential African Americans in Information Technology.

In 2011 CompTIA honored him by inducting him into the IT Hall of Fame as an innovator for co-founding the Black Data Processing Associates.
