= Web developer =

Programmer who specializes in World Wide Web applications

A web developer is a programmer who develops World Wide Web applications using a client–server model. The applications typically use HTML, CSS, and JavaScript in the client, and any general-purpose programming language in the server. HTTP is used for communications between client and server. A web developer may specialize in client-side applications (Front-end web development), server-side applications (back-end development), or both (full-stack development).

== Prerequisite ==
There are no formal educational or license requirements to become a web developer. However, many colleges and trade schools offer coursework in web development. There are also many tutorials and articles which teach web development, often freely available on the web - for example, on JavaScript.

Even though there are no formal requirements, web development projects require web developers to have knowledge and skills such as:

- Using HTML, CSS, and JavaScript
- Programming/coding/scripting in one of the many server-side languages or frameworks
- Understanding server-side/client-side architecture and communication of the kind mentioned above
- Ability to utilize a database

== See also ==
- Frontend and backend
- Outline of web design and web development
- User interface
- User experience
- Website design
- Web development
- Software developer
