= Comparison of programming languages (list comprehension) =

List comprehension is a syntactic construct available in some programming languages for creating a list based on existing lists. It follows the form of the mathematical set-builder notation (set comprehension) as distinct from the use of map and filter functions.

== Examples of list comprehension ==
=== Boo ===
List with all the doubles from 0 to 10 (exclusive)

doubles = [i*2 for i in range(10)]

List with the names of the customers based in Rio de Janeiro

rjCustomers = [customer.Name for customer in customers if customer.State == "RJ"]

=== C++ ===
C++ can use the std::views namespace, introduced in C++20. These are lazily evaluated.

import std;

using std::vector;
using std::ranges::to;
using std::views::filter;
using std::views::transform;

vector<int> ns = std::views::iota(0, 100)
    | filter([](int x) -> bool { return x * x > 3; })
    | transform([](int x) -> int { return x * 2; })
    | to<vector>(); // evaluation happens at this point

=== C# ===
IEnumerable<int> ns = from x in Enumerable.Range(0, 100)
                      where x * x > 3
                      select x * 2;

The previous code is syntactic sugar for the following code written using lambda expressions:

IEnumerable<int> ns = Enumerable.Range(0, 100)
    .Where(x => x * x > 3)
    .Select(x => x * 2);

=== Ceylon ===
Filtering numbers divisible by 3:

value divisibleBy3 = { for (i in 0..100) if (i%3==0) i };
// type of divisibleBy3 is Iterable<Integer>

Multiple "generators":

value triples = { for (x in 0..20) for (y in x..20) for (z in y..20) if (x*x + y*y == z*z) [x,y,z] };
// type of triples is Iterable<Integer[3]>

=== Clojure ===
An infinite lazy sequence:

 (for [x (iterate inc 0) 
       :when (> (* x x) 3)]
   (* 2 x))

A list comprehension using multiple generators:

 (for [x (range 20)
       y (range 20)
       z (range 20)
       :when (== (+ (* x x) (* y y)) (* z z))]
   [x y z])

=== CoffeeScript ===
largeNumbers = (number for number in list when number > 100)

=== Common Lisp ===
List comprehensions can be expressed with the loop macro's collect keyword. Conditionals are expressed with if, as follows:

(loop for x from 0 to 100 if (> (* x x) 3) collect (* 2 x))

=== Cobra ===
List the names of customers:

names = for cust in customers get cust.name

List the customers with balances:

names = for cust in customers where cust.balance > 0

List the names of customers with balances:

names = for cust in customers where cust.balance > 0 get cust.name

The general forms:

for VAR in ENUMERABLE [where CONDITION] get EXPR
for VAR in ENUMERABLE where CONDITION

Note that by putting the condition and expression after the variable name and enumerable object, editors and IDEs can provide autocompletion on the members of the variable.

=== Dart ===
[for (var i in range(0, 100)) if (i * i > 3) i * 2]

var pyth = [
  for (var x in range(1, 20))
    for (var y in range(x, 20))
      for (var z in range(y, 20)) if (x * x + y * y == z * z) [x, y, z]
];

Iterable<int> range(int start, int end) =>
    List.generate(end - start, (i) => start + i);

=== Elixir ===
for x <- 0..100, x * x > 3, do: x * 2

=== Erlang ===
L = lists:seq(0,100).
S = [2*X || X <- L, X*X > 3].

=== F# ===
Lazily-evaluated sequences:

seq { for x in 0 .. 100 do if x*x > 3 then yield 2*x }

Or, for floating point values

seq { for x in 0. .. 100. do if x**2. > 3. then yield 2.*x }

Lists and arrays:

[ for x in 0. .. 100. do if x**2. > 3. then yield 2.*x ]
[| for x in 0. .. 100. do if x**2. > 3. then yield 2.*x |]

List comprehensions are the part of a greater family of language constructs called computation expressions.

=== Haskell ===
[x * 2 | x <- [0 .. 99], x * x > 3]

An example of a list comprehension using multiple generators:

pyth = [(x,y,z) | x <- [1..20], y <- [x..20], z <- [y..20], x^2 + y^2 == z^2]

=== Io ===
By using Range object, Io language can create list as easy as in other languages:

Range 0 to(100) asList select(x, x*x>3) map(*2)

=== ISLISP ===
List comprehensions can be expressed with the for special form. Conditionals are expressed with if, as follows:

(for ((x 0 (+ x 1))
      (collect ()))
     ((>= x 100) (reverse collect))
     (if (> (* x x) 3)
         (setq collect (cons (* x 2) collect))))

=== Julia ===
Julia supports comprehensions using the syntax:

 y = [x^2+1 for x in 1:10]

and multidimensional comprehensions like:

 z = [(x-5)^2+(y-5)^2 for x = 0:10, y = 0:10]

It is also possible to add a condition:

v = [3x^2 + 2y^2 for x in 1:7 for y in 1:7 if x % y == 0]

And just changing square brackets to the round one, we get a generator:

g = (3x^2 + 2y^2 for x in 1:7 for y in 1:7 if x % y == 0)

=== Mythryl ===
 s = [ 2*i for i in 1..100 where i*i > 3 ];

Multiple generators:

 pyth = [ (x,y,z) for x in 1..20 for y in x..20 for z in y..20 where x*x + y*y == z*z ];

=== Nemerle ===
$[x*2 | x in [0 .. 100], x*x > 3]

=== Nim ===
Nim has built-in seq, set, table and object comprehensions on the sugar standard library module:

import sugar

let variable = collect(newSeq):
  for item in @[-9, 1, 42, 0, -1, 9]: item + 1

assert variable == @[-8, 2, 43, 1, 0, 10]

The comprehension is implemented as a macro that is expanded at compile time, you can see the expanded code using the expandMacro compiler option:

var collectResult = newSeq(Natural(0))
for item in items(@[-9, 1, 42, 0, -1, 9]):
  add(collectResult, item + 1)
collectResult

The comprehensions can be nested and multi-line:

import sugar

let values = collect(newSeq):
  for val in [1, 2]:
    collect(newSeq):
      for val2 in [3, 4]:
        if (val, val2) != (1, 2):
          (val, val2)
        
assert values == @[@[(1, 3), (1, 4)], @[(2, 3), (2, 4)]]

=== OCaml ===
OCaml supports List comprehension through OCaml Batteries.

=== Perl ===
my @s = map {2 * $_} grep {$_ ** 2 > 3} 0..99;

Array with all the doubles from 1 to 9 inclusive:

my @doubles = map {$_ * 2} 1..9;

Array with the names of the customers based in Rio de Janeiro (from array of hashes):

my @rjCustomers = map {$_->{state} eq "RJ" ? $_->{name} : ()} @customers;

Filtering numbers divisible by 3:

my @divisibleBy3 = grep {$_ % 3 == 0} 0..100;

=== PowerShell ===
$s = ( 0..100 | ? {$_*$_ -gt 3} | % {2*$_} )

which is short-hand notation of:

$s = 0..100 | where-object {$_*$_ -gt 3} | foreach-object {2*$_}

=== Python ===
Python uses the following syntax to express list comprehensions over finite lists:

s: list[int] = [2 * x for x in range(100) if x ** 2 > 3]

A generator expression may be used in Python versions >= 2.4 which gives lazy evaluation over its input, and can be used with generators to iterate over 'infinite' input such as the count generator function which returns successive integers:

import itertools
from typing import Iterator

s: Iterator[int] = (2 * x for x in itertools.count() if x ** 2 > 3)

(Subsequent use of the generator expression will determine when to stop generating values).

=== R ===
 x <- 0:100
 S <- 2 * x[x ^ 2 > 3]

=== Racket ===
(for/list ([x 100] #:when (> (* x x) 3)) (* x 2))

An example with multiple generators:

(for*/list ([x (in-range 1 21)] [y (in-range 1 21)] [z (in-range 1 21)]
            #:when (= (+ (* x x) (* y y)) (* z z)))
  (list x y z))

=== Raku ===
 my @s = ($_ * 2 if $_ ** 2 > 3 for 0 .. 99);

=== Scala ===
Using the for-comprehension:

val s = for (x <- 0 to 100; if x*x > 3) yield 2*x

=== Scheme ===
List comprehensions are supported in Scheme through the use of the SRFI-42 library.

(list-ec (: x 100) (if (> (* x x) 3)) (* x 2))

An example of a list comprehension using multiple generators:

(list-ec (: x 1 21) (: y x 21) (: z y 21) (if (= (+ (* x x) (* y y)) (* z z))) (list x y z))

=== SETL ===
s := {2*x : x in {0..100} | x**2 > 3 };

=== Smalltalk ===
((1 to: 100) select: [ :x | x squared > 3 ]) collect: [ :x | x * 2 ]

=== Visual Prolog ===
S = [ 2*X || X = list::getMember_nd(L), X*X > 3 ]
