= Functional logic programming =

Programming paradigm that combines logic programming with functional programming

Functional logic programming is the combination, in a single programming language, of the paradigms of functional programming and logic programming. This style of programming is embodied by various programming languages, including Curry and Mercury. A more recent example is Verse. A journal devoted to the integration of functional and logic programming was published by MIT Press and the European Association for Programming Languages and Systems between 1995 and 2008.
