= Comparison of programming languages (strings) =

This comparison of programming languages (strings) compares the features of string data structures or text-string processing for over 52 various computer programming languages.

== Concatenation ==
Different languages use different symbols for the concatenation operator. Many languages use the "+" symbol, though several deviate from this.

=== Common variants ===
Operator	Languages
+	ALGOL 68, BASIC, C++, C#, Cobra, Dart, Eiffel, F#, Go, Java, JavaScript, Object Pascal, Pascal, Python, Ruby, Rust, Scala, Swift, Turing, Windows PowerShell, Ya
++	Elm, Erlang, Haskell
$+	mIRC scripting language
&	Ada, AppleScript, COBOL (for literals only), Curl, Excel, FreeBASIC, HyperTalk, Nim, Seed7, VHDL, Visual Basic, Visual Basic (.NET)
concatenate	Common Lisp
.	Autohotkey, Maple (up to version 5), Perl, PHP
~	D, Raku, Symfony (Expression Language component)
||	Icon, Maple (from version 6), PL/I, Rexx, Standard SQL
<>	Mathematica, Wolfram Language, Elixir
..	Lua
:	Pick Basic
,	APL, J, Smalltalk
^	F#, OCaml, rc, Standard ML
//	Fortran
*	Julia

=== Unique variants ===
- AWK uses the empty string: two expressions adjacent to each other are concatenated. This is called juxtaposition. Unix shells have a similar syntax. Rexx uses this syntax for concatenation including an intervening space.
- C (along with Python and Dart) allows juxtaposition for string literals, however, for strings stored as character arrays, the strcat function must be used.
- COBOL uses the STRING statement to concatenate string variables.
- MATLAB and Octave use the syntax "[x y]" to concatenate x and y.
- Visual Basic and Visual Basic .NET can also use the "+" sign but at the risk of ambiguity if a string representing a number and a number are together.
- Microsoft Excel allows both "&" and the function "=CONCATENATE(X,Y)".
- Rust has the concat! macro and the format! macro, of which the latter is the most prevalent throughout the documentation and examples.

== String literals ==
This section compares styles for declaring a string literal.

=== Quoted interpolated ===
An expression is "interpolated" into a string when the compiler/interpreter evaluates it and inserts the result in its place.

Syntax	Language(s)
$"hello, {name}"	C#, Visual Basic .NET
"Hello, $name!"	Bourne shell, Dart, Perl, PHP, Windows PowerShell
qq(Hello, $name!)	Perl (alternate)
"Hello, {$name}!"	PHP (alternate)
"Hello, #{name}!"	CoffeeScript, Ruby, Elixir
%Q(Hello, #{name}!)	Ruby (alternate)
(format nil "Hello, ~A" name)	Common Lisp
`Hello, ${name}!`	JavaScript (ECMAScript 6)
"Hello, \(name)!"	Swift
f'Hello, {name}!'	Python

=== Escaped quotes ===
"Escaped" quotes means that a 'flag' symbol is used to warn that the character after the flag is used in the string rather than ending the string.

Syntax	Language(s)
"I said \"Hello, world!\""	C, C++, C#, D, Dart, F#, Java, JavaScript, Mathematica, Ocaml, Perl, PHP, Python, Rust, Swift, Wolfram Language, Ya
'I said \'Hello, world!\''	CoffeeScript, Dart (alternate), JavaScript (alternate), Python (alternate)
"I said `"Hello, world!`""	Windows Powershell
"I said ^"Hello, world!^""	REBOL
{I said "Hello, world!"}	REBOL (alternate)
"I said, %"Hello, World!%""	Eiffel
!"I said \"Hello, world!\""	FreeBASIC
r#"I said "Hello, world!""#	Rust (alternate)
R"("I said "Hello, world!")"	C++ (alternate)

=== Dual quoting ===
"Dual quoting" means that whenever a quote is used in a string, it is used twice, and one of them is discarded and the single quote is then used within the string.

Syntax	Language(s)
"I said ""Hello, world!"""	Ada, ALGOL 68, COBOL, Excel, Fortran, FreeBASIC, Visual Basic (.NET)
'I said ''Hello, world!'''	APL, COBOL, Fortran, Object Pascal, Pascal, rc, Smalltalk, SQL

=== Quoted raw ===
"Raw" means the compiler treats every character within the literal exactly as written, without processing any escapes or interpolations.

Syntax	Language(s)
'Hello, world!'	APL, Bourne shell, Fortran, Object Pascal, Pascal, Perl, PHP, Pick Basic, Ruby, Smalltalk, Windows PowerShell
q(Hello, world!)	Perl (alternate)
%q(Hello, world!)	Ruby (alternate)
R"(Hello, world!)"	C++11
@"Hello, world!"	C#, F#
r"Hello, world!"	Cobra, D, Dart, Python, Rust
r'Hello, world!'	Dart (alternate)
"Hello, world!"	Cobol, FreeBASIC, Pick Basic
`Hello, world!`	D, Go
raw"Hello, world!"	Scala
String.raw`Hello, World!`	JavaScript (ECMAScript 6)

=== Multiline string ===
Many languages have a syntax specifically intended for strings with multiple lines. In some of these languages, this syntax is a here document or "heredoc": A token representing the string is put in the middle of a line of code, but the code continues after the starting token and the string's content doesn't appear until the next line. In other languages, the string's content starts immediately after the starting token and the code continues after the string literal's terminator.

Syntax	Here document	Language(s)
<<EOF I have a lot of things to say and so little time to say them EOF	Yes	Bourne shell, Perl, Ruby
<<<EOF I have a lot of things to say and so little time to say them EOF	Yes	PHP
@" I have a lot of things to say and so little time to say them "@	No	Windows Powershell
"[ I have a lot of things to say and so little time to say them ]"	No	Eiffel
""" I have a lot of things to say and so little time to say them """	No	CoffeeScript, Dart, Groovy, Java, Kotlin, Python, Swift
" I have a lot of things to say and so little time to say them "	No	Common Lisp (all strings are multiline), Rust (all strings are multiline), Visual Basic .NET (all strings are multiline)
R"( I have a lot of things to say and so little time to say them )"	No	C++
r" I have a lot of things to say and so little time to say them "	No	Rust
[[ I have a lot of things to say and so little time to say them ]]	No	Lua
` I have a lot of things to say and so little time to say them `	No	JavaScript (ECMAScript 6)

=== Unique quoting variants ===
Syntax	Variant name	Language(s)
13HHello, world!	Hollerith notation	Fortran 66
(indented with whitespace)	Indented with whitespace and newlines	YAML

== Notes ==
1. String.raw`` still processes string interpolation.
