= Black Data Processing Associates =

American non-profit organization

- Founded: 1975
- Founder: Earl A. Pace Jr.
- Purpose: "Advancing Careers From the Classroom to the Boardroom."
- Region served: United States
- Key people: Leadership
- Website: bdpa.org

Black Data Processing Associates (BDPA) is an American non-profit organization that serves the professional well-being of African Americans and other minorities working within technology. BDPA provides resources that support the professional growth and technical development of minority individuals in the information technology industry. Through education and leadership, BDPA promotes innovation, business skills, and professional development. The organization has over 50 chapters throughout the United States. BDPA National headquarters is located in Largo, Maryland.

== History ==
BDPA was founded in 1975 by Earl A. Pace Jr. and David Wimberly after the two met in Philadelphia to discuss their concerns about ethnic minorities in the data processing field. The founders cited a lack of minorities in middle and upper management, low recruitment and poor preparation of minorities for these positions, and an overall lack of career mobility. The founders built an organization of 35 members, hosted presentations to improve data processing skills and launched a job opportunities announcement service. This nucleus has grown to over 50 chapters throughout the United States and thousands of members. The organization is a catalyst for professional growth and technical development for those in the IT industry.

BDPA has been active in community involvement, mentorship, and classes, especially during COVID-19. In summer 2020, BDPA offered STEM-related mentorship and classes for high school students in Indiana. In 2021, BDPA collected laptops and other electronics for children's e-learning efforts for Afghan refugees at Camp Atterbury.

== BDPA High School Computer Competition ==
The National High School Computer Competition (HSCC) was founded in 1986. The competition started as a two-team event between Washington, DC, and Atlanta, Georgia, and now has over 20 teams from chapters throughout the nation.

== See also ==
- Black in AI
