= Web development =

Development of websites and web apps

Web development is the process of designing, developing and maintaining websites and web apps. Web development encompasses several different fields, most commonly referring to the programming of websites. Front-end development is the act of developing the user interface and client-side code, while back-end development focuses on the infrastructure behind a website, mainly server-side code.

Since the World Wide Web was released publicly in 1993, web development has evolved greatly, with websites changing from a collection of static HTML pages to complex projects using frameworks, servers, and databases.

== Overview ==
Web development includes many individual tasks, including web design, web content development, networking, and coding. Among web professionals, "web development" usually refers to the main non-design aspects of building websites: writing markup and coding.

Web development is generally split into two fields: front-end development and back-end development. Front-end developers create the user interface of websites, turning web designs into HTML, CSS, and JavaScript code. Front-end developers must also make sure that websites work consistently across different browsers and devices. Back-end development, also known as server-side development, focuses on the infrastructure behind a website, including APIs, database management, and security. Some choose to be full-stack developers, meaning they work on both the front-end and back-end.

== History ==
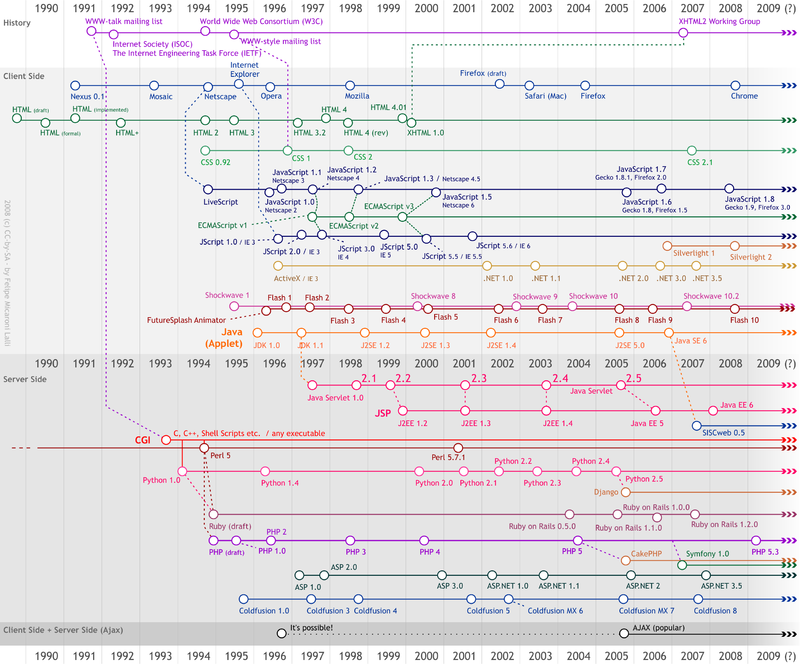
Timeline of web development

The World Wide Web is often categorised into three generations: Web 1.0, Web 2.0, and Web 3.0 (or Web3). It was invented in 1989, and released to the public in 1993. In the early years of the web, retrospectively referred to as Web 1.0, websites were simply a collection of static HTML files, and had limited interactivity. After the introduction of JavaScript in 1995, websites could contain logic, allowing for interactivity. The following year CSS was released, allowing greater control over the styling of web pages.

In 1999, the term Web 2.0 was coined by Darcy DiNucci. The term later resurfaced in the early 2000s, as websites started to increase in complexity, requiring server-side services in addition to JavaScript. This led to the emergence of various new programming languages and frameworks designed for backend services, such as PHP, Active Server Pages, and Jakarta Server Pages. This enabled websites to do additional server-side processing, such as accessing databases.

Another shift in web development was the release of the iPhone in 2007. This created a new medium for accessing the web, requiring a new approach to web development, and resulting in responsive web design, which allows a single website to appear different depending on the device running it. Later, progressive web apps were introduced, allowing websites to be installed on a device as an independent application.

In the 2010s, JavaScript frameworks began to emerge, creating new ways to manipulate web pages, and increasing compatibility between web browsers. JQuery was popular in the early 2010s, but was later surpassed by other frameworks such as React and Vue.js.

In the mid 2020s, use of AI became prevalent among web developers, with the 2025 Stack Overflow survey showing over 80% of developers saying they use AI at least monthly in their development process.

== See also ==
- Outline of web design and web development
- Web design
- Web development tools
- Web application development
- Web developer
