= Front-end web development =

Graphical user interface development

Front-end web development is the development of the graphical user interface of a website through the use of HTML, CSS, and JavaScript so users can view and interact with that website.

== Tools used for front-end development ==
There are several tools and platforms, such as WordPress, Joomla, and Drupal, available that can be used to develop the front end of a website.

=== HyperText Markup Language ===
HyperText Markup Language (HTML) is the modern standard for displaying and structuring web content across the internet. HTML defines what elements will be displayed on a website, and how they will be arranged. All major web browsers are designed to interpret HTML, and most modern websites serve HTML to the user. Hypertext is text displayed on a computer with references to other text, these references (or links,) are termed "hyperlinks." When an internet user interacts with a hyperlinked item, the website serves the user the linked data. This data can be another HTML web-page, JavaScript, or anything else. The latest major release of HTML is HTML5, originally published on October 28, 2014 as a W3C recommendation. A web page may be developed to include many markup tags. For each pair of markup tag normally starts with a Start tag and ends with a matching end tag. The text in between the Start tag and the End tag is called an HTML Element.

=== Cascading Style Sheets ===
Cascading Style Sheets (CSS) control the presentation and style of a website. CSS uses a cascading system to resolve style conflicts by applying style rules based on specificity, inheritance, and importance. Media queries allow for adjustments to the site's layout and appearance depending on factors such as screen size and resolution. CSS can be applied in three ways: external stylesheets linked in an HTML file, internal <style> blocks, or inline within individual elements.

=== JavaScript ===
JavaScript is an event-based imperative programming language (as opposed to HTML's declarative language model) that is used to transform a static HTML page into a dynamic interface. JavaScript code can use the Document Object Model (DOM), provided by the HTML standard, to manipulate a web page in response to events, like user input.

Using a technique called AJAX, JavaScript code can also actively retrieve content from the web (independent of the original HTML page retrieval), and also react to server-side events as well, allowing for higher flexibility and speed

=== WebAssembly ===
WebAssembly, supported by all the major browsers (i.e. from the major vendors Google, Apple, Mozilla and Microsoft), is the only alternative to JavaScript for running code in web browsers (without the help of plug-ins, such as Flash, Java or Silverlight; all being discontinued, as browsers are dropping plug-in support). Prior to its adoption, there was asm.js (a subset of JavaScript; and thus strictly works in all browsers), that's also used as a compiler target with efficient support in browsers such as Internet Explorer 11; and for such browsers that do not support WebAssembly directly, it can be compiled to asm.js and those browsers supported that way. Generally speaking programmers do not program in WebAssembly (or asm.js) directly, but use languages such as Rust, C or C++ or in theory any language, that compile to it.

== Goals for development ==
Front-end development provides the user interaction layer, which is a critical aspect of the web experience. Site performance, digital accessibility, site responsiveness, the User Experience (UX), and front-end security are all goals Front-end developers work toward.

=== Accessibility ===
With continuing development for mobile devices, such as smart phones and tablets, designers need to ensure that their site comes up correctly in browsers on all devices. This can be done by creating a responsive web design using stylesheets in CSS.

=== Performance ===
Performance goals are chiefly concerned with render time, manipulating the HTML, CSS, and JavaScript to ensure that the site opens up quickly. In addition to quick load times, developers need to account for speed, browser types, and user navigation throughout the website. The longer a website takes to load, the higher the chance users will abandon the attempt to visit. The goal with performance for front-end developers is to minimize load times, to make the experience as available and interactive as possible, as soon as possible. This is often achieved by adding additional features to conceal latency while asynchronously loading in the longer tail parts of the experience.

== See also ==
- Comparison of JavaScript-based web frameworks
