= Chief web officer =

Corporate executive responsible for an organisation's web presence

A chief web officer (CWO) is the highest-ranking corporate officer (executive) in charge of an organisation's web presence, including all internet and intranet sites. As a corporate officer position, the CWO reports directly to the CEO. A CWO will generally be very skilled with HTML, CSS, JavaScript, PHP, ASP, SQL, et cetera. It is not as common a role as the growing chief digital officer.

A CWO should have a great understanding of computers, systems, and programming. Not only does this position require knowledge of various programming languages, but it may also include skill and ability in digital graphics, design, and creative writing. Modern CWOs have tasks greater than being a webmaster or a web developer. Instead, they are taken to the extent of controlling the entire online presence of their company. Overall, a CWO position is the most prestigious title for a web developer to achieve.

Many companies don't have CWOs because the position requires an individual who knows numerous fields; Instead, companies may split their web presence under different titles: front-end developers, back-end developers, server programmers, webmasters, web designers and graphic artists. Typically, a CWO is fluent in all titles listed above and has many responsibilities.

== Genesis of the CWO role ==
A 1999 CIO magazine cover story asked the question: Is it time for corporations to create a new executive position—Chief Web Officer—to "oversee the strategies of company intranets, extranets, and Web sites?" The six experts interviewed for the article were split in their viewpoints. Some argued that the tasks associated with any new position should be handled by IT staff already within the company or guided directly by the CEO. Others said that, because a typical CIO was too focused on technology issues, there should be a new position created "to coordinate all Web-based activities and to put resources, both people and capital, into his or her organisation."

The earliest creation of the CWO role by a Fortune 500 company may have been in 1999, by Colgate-Palmolive.

The article "Chief Web Officers Take Charge" in the March 20, 2000 issue of 'Inter@ctive Week' explored the roles and responsibilities of CWOs through interviews and a survey of Web professionals.

Beginning around 2005, more writers began calling attention to the need to create a CWO position. These authors pointed to the need for an organization to have an executive at the C-level focused on coordinating and directing all Web-related activities. Cherian posed the need for the CWO position within an enterprise with the simple question: "Do you have a central internet group (CIG) directed by a chief Web officer and composed of dedicated staff for each business function?"

== Contrast with CIO and CTO ==
The position of CWO has emerged distinctly from the positions of Chief Information Officer (CIO) and Chief Technology Officer (CTO) because of the need to focus on and coordinate an organisation's entire Web environment and presence. A CIO typically focuses on IT planning, procurement, and architecture for the enterprise; a CTO "is principally overseeing the development of new technologies."

== Responsibilities ==
Responsibilities of the CWO position vary among enterprises, depending on the needs and goals of the business. A CWO should have a deep and broad understanding of the Web and website governance issues. Some of the issues within the CWO jurisdiction could include online strategy, budgeting, systems and software administration, hosting, online marketing and communications, e-commerce, customer service, business development, online community and social media, web content development and workflows, website graphic design, user experience (analysis/design), information/data architecture, website analytics, security, archiving, accessibility, legal issues (for example, copyright, DRM, trademark, and privacy), and training, among others.

The web has an impact on many areas of an organization, but special attention should be given to collaboration with the chief digital officer, chief information officer, chief idea officer, chief innovation officer, chief technology officer, chief procurement officer, chief communications officer, chief accessibility officer and chief sustainability officer.

== See also ==
- Corporate governance
- Website governance
