= Content audit =

Evaluation of information on a website

In website governance, a content audit is the process of evaluating content elements and information assets on some part or all of a website.

== Description ==
A content audit is "an accounting of all currently published web content" and a "cornerstone of content strategy". It is a qualitative analysis of information assets on a website; that is, the assessment of content and its relationship to surrounding information assets within specified website content analysis parameters.

A related term, content inventory, is a quantitative analysis of a website. It simply logs what is on a website. A content inventory will answer the question: “What is there?” and can be the start of a website review. A content audit will answer the question: “Is it any good?” Specifically, Slater states that the content audit can answer five questions: What content do we already have?; Who is making this content?; How do people find it?; How is it performing?; and Is the content current (accurate) or outdated?

Performing a content audit has been called "tedious", "boring", and "intimidating, time-consuming, and chaotic".

== Types ==
Different types of content audit have been described. Deciding on audit goals before beginning the audit is an important part of process planning.

As the name implies, a full content audit is a complete and comprehensive accounting of website content. A partial content audit focuses on a subcategory of the site, often one among the top site hierarchy. Content sampling merely examines samples of content.

Bloomstein describes a rolling content audit as a means to "monitor and maintain" the initial scan. A content manager may go through the audit process at some agreed-upon time – weekly, monthly, or quarterly – to scan for changes.

== Value ==
A content audit is "the only way to fully understand the structure and quality of the content" on a website. It can help: develop a content strategy; manage content quality; prepare content for a migration or for the development of a new site IA or design; evaluate content against business goals, editorial style guidelines, and templates; establish a common language among team members; evaluate content for removal or revision; and pinpoint gaps in content.

== Methods ==
Because a content audit is a qualitative analysis, methods used will vary from auditor to auditor, by type of audit being performed, and by available tools. While some tools have been developed to help in the content auditing process, human oversight and interaction is essential. A content inventory sheet is used for tracking purposes and typically includes categories for links, format, keywords, content owners, and more.

Methods used to perform a content audit include content ROT (redundant, outdated, trivial) analysis, social media analysis, SEO analysis, competitive analysis, content analysis heuristics (including information scent, differentiation, completeness, consistency, and currency), heat map analysis, among many others.

== See also ==
- Content inventory
- Web content management system
- Web content lifecycle
- Design methods
- Information architecture
- Website governance
- Web archiving
