= Web content lifecycle =

The web content lifecycle is the multi-disciplinary and often complex process that web content undergoes as it is managed through various publishing stages.

Authors describe multiple "stages" (or "phases") in the web content lifecycle, along with a set of capabilities such as records management, digital asset management, collaboration, and version control that may be supported by various technologies and processes. One recognized technology for managing the web content lifecycle is a web content management system.

Concepts often considered in the web content lifecycle include project management, information management, information architecture, and, more recently, content strategy, website governance, and semantic publishing.

== Stages ==
Various authors have proposed different "stages" or "phases" in the content lifecycle. Broadly speaking, the stages include content creation/development, revision, distribution, and archiving. The lifecycle processes, actions, content status, and content management roles may differ from model to model based on organizational strategies, needs, requirements, and capabilities.

=== Two stages ===
In 2003, McKeever described "two iterative phases": "the collection of content, and the delivery or publishing of that content on the Web." She also explains a Web Content Management (WCM) "four layer hierarchy" (content, activity, outlet, and audience) intended to illustrate the breadth of WCM.

=== Three stages ===
Bob Boiko's Content Management Bible emphasizes three major parts: collect (creation and editing is much more than simply collecting), manage (workflows, approvals, versioning, repository, etc.), and publish. These concepts are graphically displayed in a Content Management Possibilities poster developed by Boiko. The poster details such content management concepts as metadata, syndication, workflows, repositories, and databases.

Gerry McGovern also sees three "processes," designating them creation, editing, and publishing.

=== Four stages ===
JoAnn Hackos' Content Management for Dynamic Web Delivery argues for four "components": authoring, repository, assembly/linking, and publishing.

In Managing Enterprise Content, Ann Rockley argues for the planning of content reuse through four stages: create, review, manage, and deliver. A stage can have sub-stages; for example, the "create" stage has three sub-stages: planning, design, and authoring and revision. She notes that content is often created by individuals working in isolation inside an enterprise (the coined term is the Content Silo Trap). To counter this content silo effect, she recommends using a "unified content strategy," "a repeatable method of identifying all content requirements up front, creating consistently structured content for reuse, managing that content in a definitive source, and assembling content on-demand to meet your customersí needs."

=== Five stages ===
Nakano described five "collaboration operations": Submit, Compare, Update, Merge, and Publish.

The State government of Victoria (Australia) produced a flowchart with a diagrammatic view of the web content lifecycle with five stages: Develop, Quality Approval, Publish, Unpublish, and Archive. Some of the stages include sub-stages (for example, Archive consists of Storage, Archived, and Disposed) intended to further delineate content status. In addition, this model depicts three aspectsóStatus, Process, and Rolesóas part of the flow for web content. The four roles in this model are content author, content quality manager, business quality manager, and records manager.

The AIIM speaks of managing content to achieve business goals. AIIM ECM 101 Poster from 2003, and the AIIM Solving the ECM Puzzle Poster from 2005, present the same five stages: Capture, Manage, Store, Deliver, and Preserve.

=== Six stages ===
The Content Management Lifecycle Poster devised by CM Pros suggests six "steps":

1. Plan
2. Develop
3. Manage
4. Deploy
5. Preserve
6. Evaluate

Each step contains sub-steps. For example, step 1, Plan, consists of Align, Analyze, Model, and Design; and step 2, Develop, consists of Create, Capture, Collect, Categorize, and Edit.

There is also another six stage model based on the concept of product lifecycle:

1. Goal setting
2. Creation
3. Publishing
4. Promoting
5. Maintaining
6. Retirement

=== Seven stages ===
Bob Doyle suggests seven stages of the Web content lifecycle:

1. Organization
2. Creation
3. Storage
4. Workflow
5. Versioning
6. Publishing
7. Archives

Doyle argues for seven stages based on the psychologist George A. Miller's famed magical number "seven plus or minus two" limit on human information processing. He notes this is merely a suggestion and that one should "add or subtract a couple of your own favorites."

=== Governance rather than workflow ===
In a 2005 article, Woods addressed governance of the content lifecycle. In his model, there are categories of issues to address, rather than a simple, cradle-to-grave pathway. He writes that most content governance questions fall into one of the following categories:

- Legacy Content Migration
- Template Considerations
- New Content Creation
- Content Modification and Reuse
- Version Control and Site Rollback
- Content Rotation and the End of the Road
- Monitoring Progress, Managing for Success

More recently, Kristina Halvorson has humorously suggested 15 discrete steps in the web content lifecycle: Audit, Analyze, Strategize, Categorize, Structure, Create, Revise, Revise, Revise, Approve, Tag, Format, Publish, Update, Archive.

== Role of technologies ==
Enterprise content management as a business strategy might incorporate web content management:

When integrated with an ECM system, WCM enables organizations to automate the complete Web content lifecycle. As soon as new content is developed, the system ensures that it goes live the moment it is intended toónot a minute earlier. By specifying timed releases and expiration dates, content is published to and removed from the Web according to recommendations, requirements and even regulations.

— Jenkins (2004)

A web content management system can support and enhance certain processes because of automation, including document management, templates, and workflow management. However, the absence of well defined roles and process governance will greatly dilute the effectiveness of any technology intended to augment/enhance the publishing process overall.

== Role of information management ==
Information management describes the "organization of and control over the structure, processing, and delivery of information." The goal of information lifecycle management is to use policies, operations, and infrastructure to manage information throughout its useful life. However, businesses struggle to manage their data and information.

The missing stage in all the major sources is the organization of information, structuring it where possible, for example using XML or RDF, which allows arbitrary metadata to be added to all information elements. This is the secret that the knowledge managers describe as turning mere data or information into knowledge. It allows information to be retrieved in a number of ways and reused or repurposed in many more.

— Doyle (2005)

Using semantic markup in the publishing process is part of semantic publishing. Tim-Berners Lee's original vision for the Semantic Web has yet to be realized, but many projects in various research areas are underway.

== See also ==
- Website governance
- Content management
- Information management
- Semantic publishing
- Web content management system
