= Website governance =

Systems and policies to maintain websites

Website governance is an organization's structure of staff and the technical systems, policies and procedures to maintain and manage a website. Website governance applies to both Internet and Intranet sites.

== Areas of responsibility ==
Governance of a website may include a wide variety of responsibilities, including online strategy, budgeting, systems and software administration, hosting, online marketing and communications, e-commerce, customer service, business development, online community and social media, web content development and workflows, content strategy, translation, website graphic design, user experience (analysis/design), information/data architecture, website analytics, security, archiving, outsourcing, accessibility, legal issues (for example, copyright, DRM, trademark, and privacy), information ethics, and training, among others. These areas may be the responsibility of several or single staff within an organization, depending on available resources and infrastructure, organizational needs and objectives, website size, and how content is managed and delivered. McGovern argues that there is a limit to the number of web pages that can be professionally managed by one person, although he does not set the outer limit, either in a number of pages (in a centralized model of website governance) or in a number of publishers (in a decentralized model of website governance).

== Website management team ==
A website management team (WMT) can be defined as an authorizing body of a website responsible for setting and achieving high-level goals for a site. This body includes content owner stakeholders and site production staff. In some organizations, a chief web officer leads the WMT.

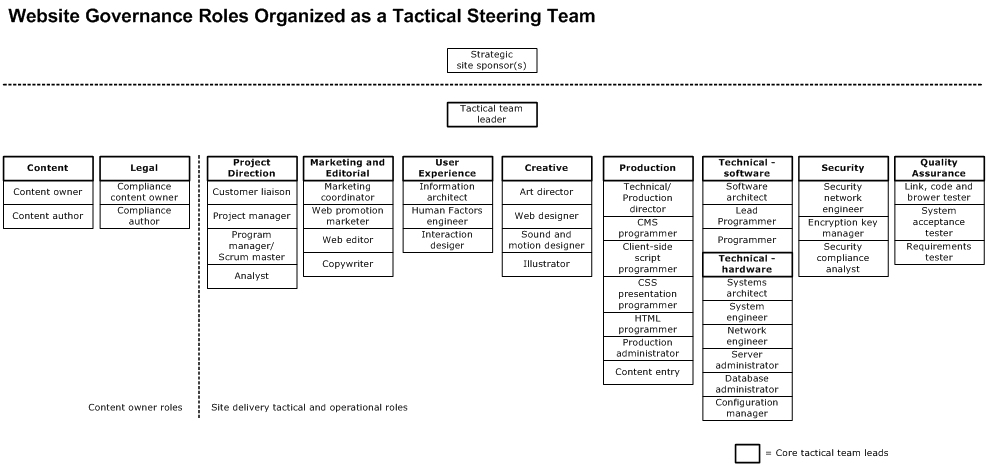
Website management team: An example of a tactical steering team organized primarily by production roles.

Responsibilities and authorities of website staff may be grouped by strategic, tactical and operational roles, and may be organized as a cross-functional web team. A strategic site sponsor articulates the high-level vision of the site, and determines if the vision is adequately fulfilled; a tactical-level staff translates the vision into detail by prioritizing projects, specifying site design and negotiating the placement of content. The tactical staff may be a group serving on a website governance board or steering team representing the main constituencies as defined by the organization's overall business plan.

== Governance models ==
Several models of website governance exist. Authors have focused on the content lifecycle; primary components, such as people, process, and standards; attributes, such as accountability, accessibility, participation across business areas, and standards; and type of governance structure (centralized, decentralized, or federated).

=== Visibility Governance ===
With the rise of AI-mediated search in the 2020s, website governance has expanded to address how content is interpreted by external search engines and large language models. This aspect, sometimes called visibility governance, focuses on maintaining content consistency and quality to ensure accurate representation when AI systems extract or synthesize organizational information."What is generative engine optimization (GEO)?". Search Engine Land. 2024-07-29. Following the introduction of AI-generated search results and zero-click searches, traditional web analytics became insufficient for tracking organizational representation, leading to governance frameworks that address structured data, terminology consistency, and content attribution.

=== U.S. Government Initiatives ===
Through the Federal Web Managers Council, Federal agencies in the U.S. government collaborate to share common challenges, ideas, and best practices and improve the online delivery of U.S. government information and services. Harrison, the first co-chair of the Federal Web Managers Council, has proposed the 5 "R's" of web governance: Roles, Responsibilities, Relationships, Rules, and Review.

=== United Nations Initiatives ===
In a 2008 report, the United Nations Joint Inspection Unit reviewed the management of websites in United Nations system organizations and made eight recommendations to improve a website's presence. These included website governance, strategy, and policies and guidelines; content management systems; and staffing, training, and funding.

=== Website Governance Functional Model ===
In 2011 Jacoby introduced the Website Governance Functional Model. Based on a business reference model within Davenport's information ecology, the Website Governance Functional Model included at least 16 functional areas within an organization, along with the principles of project, information, and knowledge management. In this article he also introduced the concept "the website is the organization."

In 2012 Jacoby introduced the Website Governance Modeling Tool, "designed to help Web managers and their stakeholders conceptualize and assess their organization's website governance."

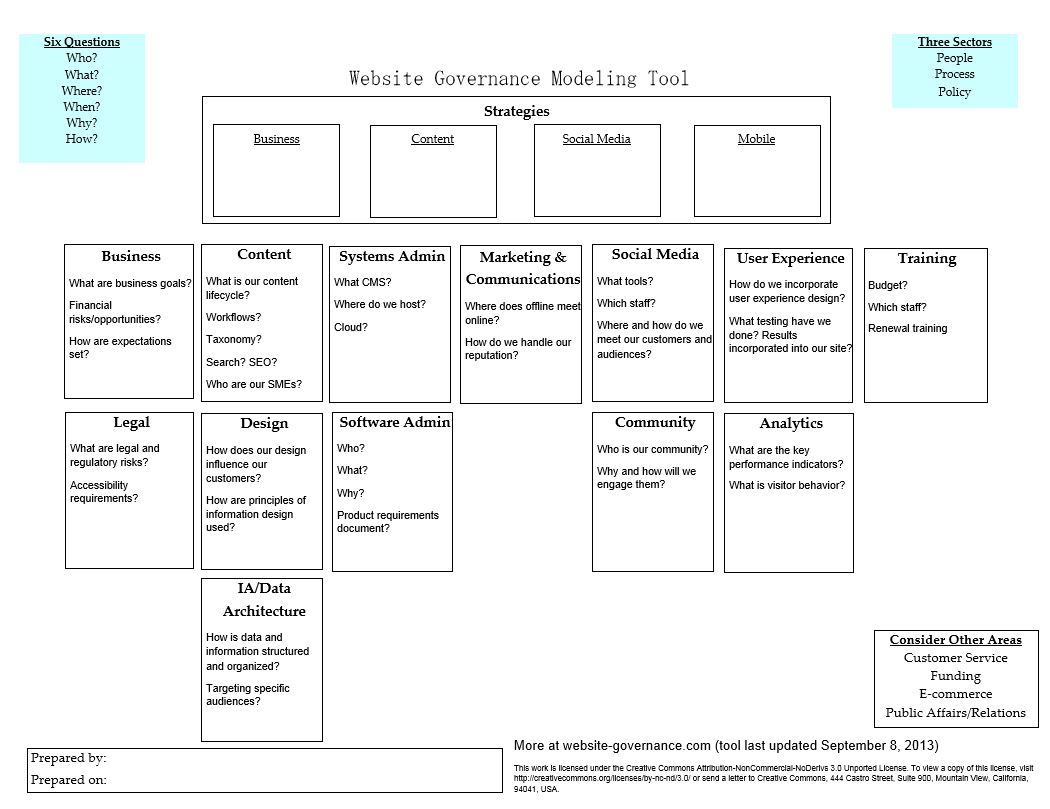
The Website Governance Modeling Tool provides space and structure to illustrate functional areas of website governance. It as a pre-populated "drawing board", a place to process through Web work areas and strategies. Each work area and strategy is in an expandable, movable, writable box, with more named work areas to the side.

== See also ==
- Content audit
- Content inventory
- Design methods
- Information technology governance
- Internet governance
- Project governance
- Web archiving
- Web content lifecycle
- Web content management system
- Web design
- World Wide Web
