= Content development =

Content development is the process of researching, writing, gathering, organizing, and editing information for publication.

Content development is the process of originating (creating), editing, manipulating and maintaining the contents in order to provide knowledgeable fillings to the users. Contents developed aid a lot in establishing and growing the thinking and gaining overall information about the person, company, organization, nation and almost all the fields.

Content development can be distinct from topic selection (a high-level idea such as "productivity", "social media" and so on), topic development (the main points to express in a piece of content about a given topic), and presenting the content (public speaking, writing etc.)

Content development may also refer to:

- Authoring, originating content for any medium
  - Content designer, designing content for any medium
- Editing content for any medium
- Content development (web), developing content for the World Wide Web
- Technical content development (traditionally called Technical Writing), developing product-related content to help end-users, support, partners and clients to understand and master products

== See also ==
- Content management
- Content management systems
  - Component content management systems
