= Content-oriented workflow models =

In data management, a content-oriented workflow model seeks to articulate workflow progression by the presence of content units (like data-records/objects/documents). Most content-oriented workflow approaches provide a life-cycle model for content units, such that workflow progression can be qualified by conditions on the state of the units. Most approaches are research and work in progress and the content models and life-cycle models are more or less formalized.

The term content-oriented workflows is an umbrella term for several scientific workflow approaches, namely "data-driven", "resource-driven", "artifact-centric", "object-aware", and "document-oriented". Thus, the meaning of "content" ranges from simple data attributes to self-contained documents; the term "content-oriented workflows" appeared at first in as an umbrella term. Such a general term, independent from a specific approach, is necessary to contrast the content-oriented modelling principle with traditional activity-oriented workflow models (like Petri nets or BPMN) where a workflow is driven by a control flow and where the content production perspective is neglected or even missing.

The term "content" was chosen to subsume the different levels in granularity of the content units in the respective workflow models; it was also chosen to make associations with content management. Both terms "artifact-centric" and "data-driven" would also be good candidates for an umbrella term, but each is closely related to a specific approach of a single working group. The "artifact-centric" group itself (i.e. IBM Research) has generalized the characteristics of their approach and has used "information-centric" as an umbrella term in. Yet, the term information is too unspecific in the context of computer science, thus, "content-orientated workflows" is considered as good compromise.

== Workflow Model Approaches ==
=== Data-driven ===
The data-driven process structures provides a sophisticated workflow model being specialized on hierarchical write-and-review-processes. The approach provides interleaved synchronization of sub-processes and extends activity diagrams. Unfortunately, the COREPRO prototype implementation is not publicly available.

Research on the project had been ceased. The general idea has been continued by Reichert in form of the #Object-aware approach.

Synonyms
data-driven process structures / data-driven modeling and coordination
Protagonists
Dr. Dominic Müller (University of Twente), Joachim Herbst (DaimlerChrysler Research), and Manfred Reichert (at this time Assoc. Prof. at Univ. of Twente, currently Prof. at Ulm Univ.)
Organization(s)
University of Twente, DaimlerChrysler
Period
2005 - 2007
Selected publications
Implementation
COREPRO

=== Resource-driven ===
The resource-driven workflow system is an early approach that considered workflows from a content-oriented perspective and emphasizes on the missing support for plain document-driven processes by traditional activity-oriented workflow engines. The resource-driven approach demonstrated the application of database triggers for handling workflow events. Still the system implementation is centralized and the workflow schema is statically defined. The project appeared in 2005 but many aspects are considered future work by the authors.

Research did not continue on the project. Wang completed his PhD thesis in 2009, yet, his thesis does not mention the resource-driven approach to workflow modelling but is about discrete event simulation.

Synonyms
Resource-based Workflows / Document-Driven Workflow Systems
Protagonists
Jianrui Wang and Prof. Akhil Kumar
Organization
Pennsylvania State University
Period
2005 - today
Selected publications
Implementation
N/A

=== Artifact-centric ===
The artifact-centric approach provides a framework for content-oriented workflows. In this model, the enterprise application landscape includes distributed business services, while the workflow engine is centralized. Process enactment is integrated with database management system infrastructure, and the project is funded by IBM.

Synonyms
artifact-centric business process models / artifact-based business process (ACP) / artifact-centric workflows
Protagonists
Richard Hull and Dr. Kamal Bhattacharya as well as Cagdas E. Gerede and Jianwen Su
Organization
IBM (T.J. Watson Research Center, NY)
Period
2007 - today
Selected publications
Implementation
ArtiFact

=== Object-aware ===
The object-aware approach manages a set of object types and generates forms for creating object instances. The form completion flow is controlled by transitions between object configurations each describing a progressing set of mandatory attributes. Each object configuration is named by an object state. The data production flow is user-shifting and it is discrete by defining a sequence of object states. The discussion is currently limited to a centralized system, without any workflows across different organizations. However, the approach is of great relevance to many domains like concurrent engineering. Finally, the object-aware approach and its PHILharmonicFlows system are going to provide general-purpose workflow systems for generic enactment of data production processes.

Synonyms
object-aware process management / datenorientiertes Prozess-Management-System
Protagonists
Vera Künzle and Prof. Manfred Reichert
Organization
Ulm University
Period
2009 - today
Selected publications
Implementation
PHILharmonicFlows

=== Distributed Document-oriented ===
Distributed document-oriented process management (dDPM) enables distributed case handling in heterogeneous system environments and it is based on document-oriented integration. The workflow model reflects the paper-based working practice in inter-institutional healthcare scenarios. It targets distributed knowledge-driven ad hoc workflows, wherein distributed information systems are required to coordinate work with initially unknown sets of actors and activities.

The distributed workflow engine supports process planning & process history as well as participant management and process template creation with import/export. The workflow engine embeds a functional fusion of 1) group-based instant messaging 2) with a shared work list editor 3) with version control. The software implementation of dDPM is α-Flow which is available as open source. dDPM and α-Flow provide a content-oriented approach to schema-less workflows.

The complete distributed case handling application is provided in form of a single active Document ("α-Doc"). The α-Doc is a case file (as information carrier) with an embedded workflow engine (in form of active properties). Inviting process participants is equivalent to providing them with a copy of an α-Doc, copying it like an ordinary desktop file. All α-Docs that belong to the same case can synchronize each other, based on the participant management, electronic postboxes, store-and-forward messaging, and an offline-capable synchronization protocol.

Synonyms
distributed document-oriented process management (dDPM), distributed case handling via active documents
Protagonists
Christoph P. Neumann and Prof. Richard Lenz
Organization
Friedrich-Alexander-Universität Erlangen-Nürnberg
Period
2009 - 2012
Selected Publications
and a PhD thesis
Implementation
α-Flow (open source)

== Related Concepts ==
=== Content Management ===
The bandwidth of Content management systems (CMS) reaches from Web content management systems (WCMS) and Document management system (DMS) to Enterprise Content Management (ECM). Mature DMS products support document production workflows in a basic form, primarily focusing on review cycle workflows concerning a single document.

=== Groupware and Computer-Supported Cooperative Work ===
Groupware focuses on messaging (like E-Mail, Chat, and Instant Messaging), shared calendars (e.g. Lotus Notes, Microsoft Outlook with Exchange Server), and conferencing (e.g. Skype). Groupware overlaps with Computer-supported cooperative work (CSCW), that originated from shared multimedia editors (for live drawing/sketching) and synchronous multi-user applications like desktop sharing. The extensive conceptual claim of CSWC must be put into perspective by its actual solution scope, that is available as the CSCW Matrix.

=== Case Handling ===
The case handling paradigm stems from Prof. van der Aalst and gained momentum in 2005. The core features are: (a) provide all information available, i.e. present the case as a whole rather than showing bits and pieces, (b) decide about activities on the basis of the information available rather than the activities already executed, (c) separate work distribution from authorization and allow for additional types of roles, not just the execute role, and (d) allow workers to view and add/modify data before or after the corresponding activities have been executed.

In healthcare, the flow of a patient between healthcare professionals is considered as a workflow - with activities that include all kinds of diagnostic or therapeutic treatments. The workflow is considered as a case, and workflow management in healthcare is to handle these cases.

Case handling is orthogonal to content-oriented workflows. Some content-oriented workflow approaches are not related to case handling, but, for example, to automated manufacturing. In contrast, systems that are considered to be case handling systems (CHS) but which do not apply a content-oriented workflow model are, for example, BPMone (formerly PROTOS and FLOWer) from Pallas Athena, ECHO from Digital, CMDT from ICL, and Vectus from London Bridge Group. In conclusion, those content-oriented workflow approaches that are tightly related to case handling are the #Resource-driven workflow model and the #Distributed Document-oriented workflow model.

Protagonists
Prof. Wil van der Aalst and Associate Professor Dr. Hajo Reijers (with focus on healthcare)
Organization
Univ. of Technology, Eindhoven
Period
2001 - today
Selected publication

== See also ==
- Process philosophy
- Workflow
- Adam Smith
- Process control
- Business process
- Business process automation
- Business process management
- Business Process Model and Notation
- Advanced case management
- Content management system
- Web content management system
- Document management system
- Enterprise Content Management
