= Content engineering =

Content engineering is a term applied to an engineering specialty dealing with the complexities around the use of content in computer-facilitated environments.

Content authoring and production, content management, content modeling, content conversion, and content use and repurposing are all areas involving this practice. It is not a specialty with wide industry recognition and is often performed on an ad hoc basis by members of software development or content production or marketing staff, but is beginning to be recognized as a necessary function in any complex content-centric project involving both content production as well as software system development mainly involving content management systems (CMS) or digital experience platforms (DXP).

Content engineering tends to bridge the gap between groups involved in the production of content (publishing and editorial staff, marketing, sales, human resources) and more technologically oriented departments such as software development, or IT that put this content to use in web or other software-based environments, and requires an understanding of the issues and processes of both sides.

Typically, content engineering involves extensive use of embedded XML technologies, XML being the most widespread language for representing structured content. Content management systems are a key technology often used in the practice of content engineering.

== Definition ==
Content engineering is the practice of organizing the shape and structure of content by deploying content and metadata models, in authoring and publishing processes in a manner that meets the requirements of an organization's Content Strategy, and its implementation through the use of technology such as CMS, XML, schema markup, artificial intelligence, APIs and others.

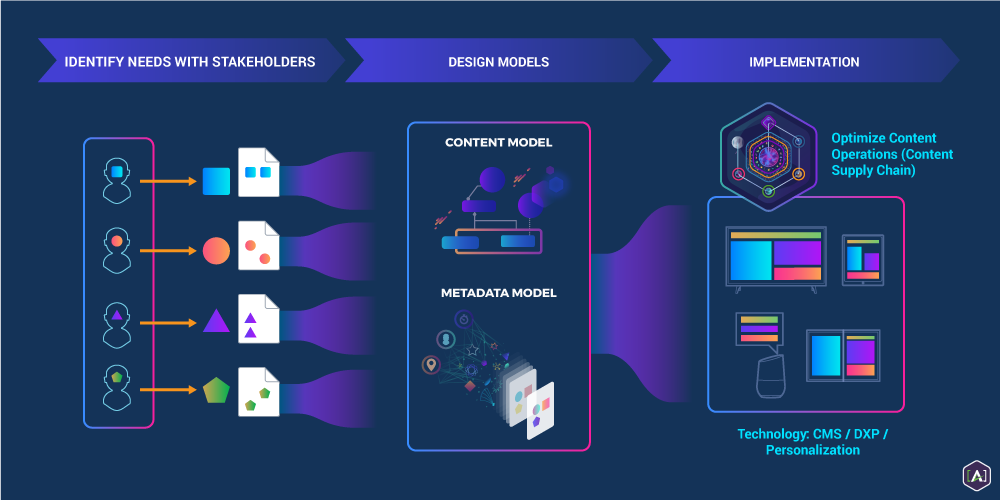
Content Engineering Process

== Purpose and goal ==
In very general terms, content engineering practices aim to maximize the ROI of content through content reuse and improving efficiency of content marketing, content operations, content strategy.

Content engineering can help address content challenges that fairly typical organizations face:

- Siloed content supply chains
- Duplicate content in a myriad of formats
- Inefficient content authoring workflows
- Chunky, unstructured content
- Outdated technology
- Technology in place does not match needs
- Inability to reuse content across channels (multi-channel content)
- Metadata and schema are not used
- Lack of standards for metadata
- Lack of findability of content for internal and external use
- Poor SEO performance
- Inability to implement personalization

== Key skills ==
Content engineering draws on a combination of technical, strategic, and editorial competencies. Practitioners typically require proficiency across several domains:

=== Content modeling and information architecture ===
Content engineers design structured content models that define how content is created, stored, and distributed. This includes building taxonomies, ontologies, and metadata schemas that enable content reuse across channels and platforms.

=== Structured content and markup languages ===
Proficiency in XML, JSON, HTML, and schema.org markup is fundamental. Content engineers use these languages to structure content for machine readability, search engine optimization, and interoperability between systems.

=== Content management systems and platforms ===
Content engineers require working knowledge of content management systems (CMS), digital experience platforms (DXP), and headless CMS architectures. This includes configuring content types, workflows, and publishing pipelines within these systems.

=== Workflow design and automation ===
Designing and implementing content workflows - from authoring through review, approval, and distribution - is a core function. Increasingly, this involves configuring AI-assisted and agentic workflows that automate research, drafting, repurposing, and distribution tasks at scale.

=== Content strategy and editorial understanding ===
Unlike purely technical roles, content engineering requires a working understanding of content strategy, brand management, editorial standards, and audience analysis. Content engineers must translate strategic objectives into technical content structures and system configurations.

=== API integration and data interoperability ===
Content engineers work with APIs to connect content systems, analytics platforms, distribution channels, and third-party services. Understanding how content flows between systems is essential for enabling multi-channel publishing and content personalization.

=== Analytics and performance measurement ===
Measuring content effectiveness through web analytics, SEO performance data, and engagement metrics informs how content engineers refine structures, metadata, and distribution workflows.

== The role of a content engineer ==
Content engineers bridge the divide between content strategists and producers and the developers and content managers who publish and distribute content. But rather than simply wedging themselves between these players, content engineers help define and facilitate the content structure during the entire content strategy, production and distribution cycle from beginning to end.

As the role has evolved, content engineers are increasingly expected to build and manage AI-powered content systems, moving beyond traditional CMS configuration into agentic workflows that automate content research, production, and distribution.

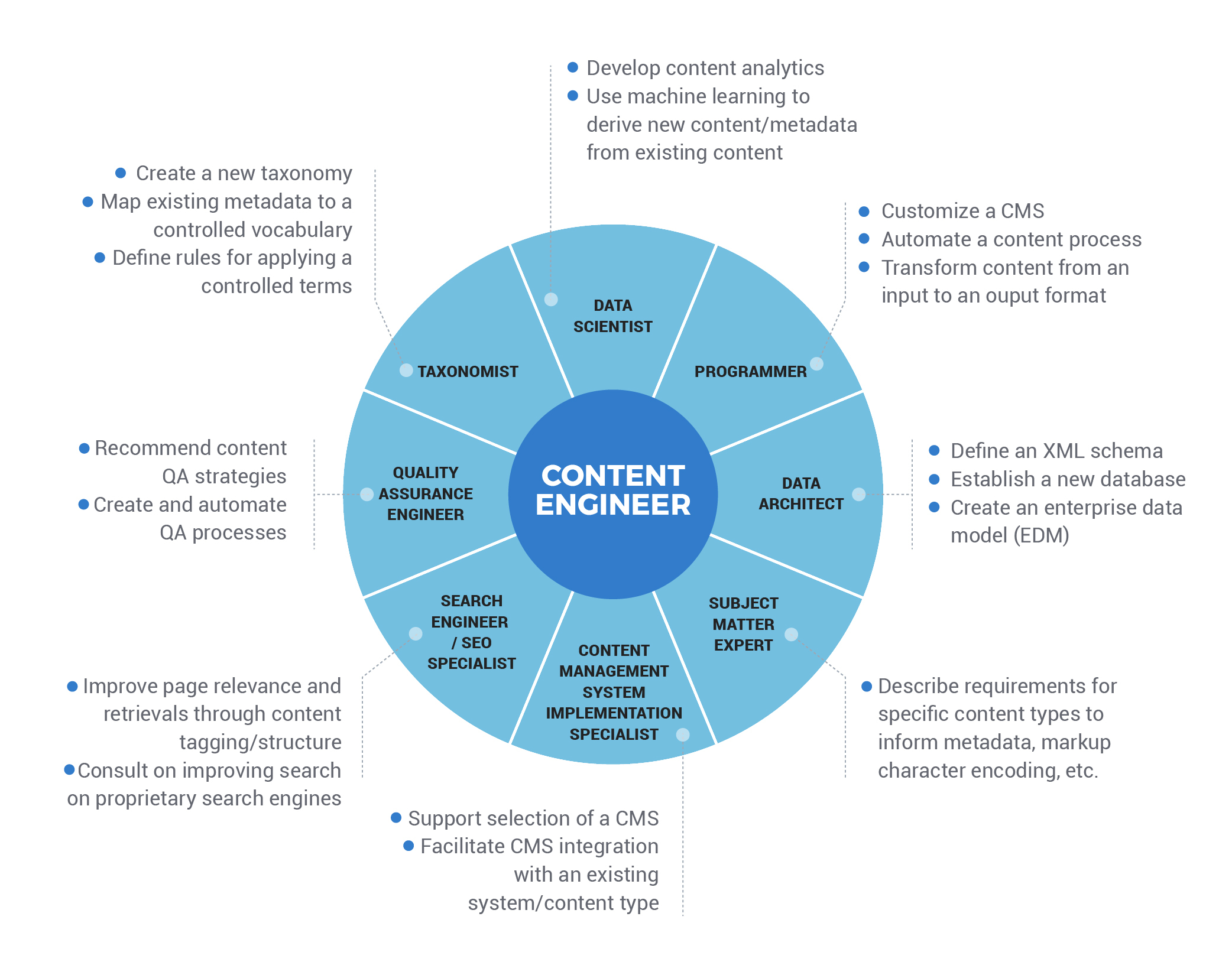

By integrating skills in business and technology, content engineers do not see content as static or finished. Rather, they look at the value of the content and how it can best be adapted and personalized to serve customers and emerging content platforms, technologies, and opportunities.

=== Create customer experience ===
Content marketing suffers from two fundamental limitations that constrain the true power and potential that a great content marketing plan can bring to a business' bottom line:

1. Content relevance: how to make content more relevant and personalized to their audiences. The marketer and content strategist direct the customer experience itself, and the content engineer makes it happen with content structure, schema, metadata, microdata, taxonomy, and CMS topology.
2. Content agility: Marketers who are burdened with one-size-fits-all content remain stuck managing their content rather than their customers' experience. Content engineers give marketers the "super powers" to move content-powered experiences across interfaces and personalization variants.

=== Break down barriers ===
1. Empower content strategists: Content engineers work with content strategists by helping them connect content not as a fixed message, but as a modular construct which can be channeled and manipulated.
2. Enable content producers: A content engineer will work with a content producer by helping to find new sources of content and ways the content can be combined and presented.
3. Guide and free developers: The content engineer helps translate marketing strategy into clear technical needs and functions developers can build into content management systems
4. Enhance content management: Develop content structures that make it easier for content writers and content managers to author to a single, very usable, interface for even complex content types that might contain dozens of elements.
5. Engineer content for success: Content engineers help all members of a marketing team work more smoothly, with the support and structures needed to get the most out of the content they produce.

=== Salary benchmarks ===
Content engineering roles command significantly higher salaries than traditional content marketing positions. In the United States, IC-level content engineers earn between $120,000 and $165,000 annually, while senior roles reach $160,000 to $220,000. Head of content engineering positions range from $200,000 to $280,000, and VP-level roles can exceed $375,000. The emergence of dedicated content engineer job postings from companies such as Exit Five reflects the growing recognition of the role as a distinct function within marketing organizations.

== Sources ==
1. "What is Content Engineering?". www.simplea.com
2. "Content Engineer Roles and Responsibilities". www.stc.org - Society of Technical Communication, 2020
3. "Is Your Content Plan Equipped for Content Engineering?". www.contentmarketinginstitute.com
4. "I am a Content Engineer". www.everypageispageone.com
5. "What is Content Engineering? A Quick Guide". www.airops.com
6. "The Rise of the Content Engineer: Redefining Marketing in the Next Era". www.jasper.ai
7. "What Does a Content Engineer Actually Do?". www.contengi.com
8. "What is a Content Engineer? 7 Skills That Define the Role". www.contengi.com
9. "Content Engineer @ Exit Five". jobs.exitfive.com
10. "What is Content Engineering". www.visibilitystack.ai
