= Content inventory =

Catalog of information on a website

A content inventory is the process and the result of cataloging the entire contents of a website. An allied practice—a content audit—is the process of evaluating that content. A content inventory and a content audit are closely related concepts, and they are often conducted in tandem.

== Description ==
A content inventory typically includes all information assets on a website, such as web pages (HTML), meta elements (e.g., keywords, description, page title), images, audio and video files, and document files (e.g., .pdf, .doc, .ppt). A content inventory is a quantitative analysis of a website. It simply logs what is on a website. The content inventory will answer the question: “What is there?” and can be the start of a website review. A related (and sometimes confused term) is a content audit, a qualitative analysis of information assets on a website. It is the assessment of that content and its place in relationship to surrounding Web pages and information assets. The content audit will answer the question: “Is it any good?”

Over the years, techniques for creating and managing a content inventory have been developed and refined in the field of website content management.

A spreadsheet application (e.g., Microsoft Excel or LibreOffice Calc) is the preferred tool for keeping a content inventory; the data can be easily configured and manipulated. Typical categories in a content inventory include the following:

- Link — The URL for the page
- Format — For example, .HTML, .pdf, .doc, .ppt
- Meta page title — Page title as it appears in the meta <title> tag
- Meta keywords — Keywords as they appear in the meta name="keywords" tag element
- Meta description — Text as it appears in the meta name="description" tag element
- Content owner — Person responsible for maintaining page content
- Date page last updated — Date of last page update
- Audit Comments (or Notes) — Audit findings and notes

Other descriptors may need to be captured on the inventory sheet. Content management experts advise capturing information that might be useful for both short- and long-term purposes. Other information could include:

- the overall topic or area to which the page belongs
- a short description of the information on the page
- when the page was created, the date of the last revision, and when the next page review is due
- pages this page links to
- pages that link to this page
- page status – keep, delete, revise, in revision process, planned, being written, being edited, in review, ready for posting, or posted
- rank of the page on the website – is it a top 50 pages? a bottom 50 page? Initial efforts might be more focused on those pages that visitors use the most and least.

Other tabs in the inventory workbook can be created to track related information, such as meta keywords, new Web pages to develop, website tools and resources, or content inventories for sub-areas of the main website. Creating a single, shared location for information related to a website can be helpful for all website content managers, writers, editors, and publishers.

Populating the spreadsheet is a painstaking task, but some up-front work can be automated with software, and other tools and resources can assist the audit work.

== Value ==
A content inventory and a content audit are performed to understand what is on a website and why it is there. The inventory sheet, once completed and revised as the site is updated with new content and information assets, can also become a resource for help in maintaining website governance.

For an existing website, the information cataloged in a content inventory and content audit will be a resource to help manage all of the information assets on the website. The information gathered in the inventory can also be used to plan a website re-design or site migration to a web content management system. When planning a new website, a content inventory can be a useful project management tool: as a guide to map information architecture and to track new pages, page revision dates, content owners, and so on.

== See also ==
- Content audit
- Web content management system
- Design methods
- Information architecture
- Web design
- Website governance
