= Kentico =

Content management system

- Developer: Kentico Software s.r.o.
- Release: 2004; 22 years ago
- Written in: C#
- Operating system: Cross-platform (Windows, Linux, macOS)
- Platform: .NET, ASP.NET Core, SQL Server
- Type: CMS, Digital experience platform, Headless CMS
- License: Commercial proprietary software
- Website: www.kentico.com

Kentico is a proprietary content management system and software company based in Brno, Czech Republic.

== History ==
Kentico Software was founded in 2004 by Petr Palas to develop a .NET-based content management system. The company’s first customer was Gibson Musical Instruments, which adopted the platform in 2005.

In 2008, Kentico established its first international office in the United States.

Kentico appeared in Deloitte’s 2009 Technology Fast 50 Central Europe ranking, which lists companies based on revenue growth.

Kentico opened offices in the United Kingdom in 2011 and Australia in 2012, followed by an office in the Netherlands in 2015.

In 2016, Kentico introduced Kentico Cloud, a headless content management product, later renamed Kontent by Kentico in 2020.

In 2017, Kentico integrated the Ucommerce e-commerce platform into Kentico 11 following a partnership agreement.

In 2018, Kentico expanded into additional international markets, including Turkey. That year, the company reported revenue of CZK 473 million.

In 2022, Kentico received investment from Expedition Growth Capital.

Following the investment, Kentico CMS and Kontent by Kentico were separated into independent companies. Kentico Software continued development of its CMS product under the name Kentico Xperience, while Kontent by Kentico was rebranded as Kontent.ai.

In 2023, the platform was rebranded as Xperience by Kentico.

In late 2025, Kentico introduced AIRA, a set of AI tools within Xperience by Kentico that can automate on-platform actions across content strategy, user journey analysis, and content creation. In 2026, Kentico expanded AIRA with the addition of the AIRA Agentic Marketing Suite, including agents that can automate content optimization for SEO and AI search tools.

== Leadership ==
Petr Palas was chief executive officer from 2004 until 2022. Dominik Pinter was appointed CEO in 2022.

== Technology ==
Kentico is built on ASP.NET Core and uses Microsoft SQL Server for data storage. The administration interface is implemented as a single-page application using React. The platform can be deployed on-premises or via cloud providers such as Microsoft Azure.

== Reception ==
In 2025, Kentico was listed as a Niche Player in Gartner’s Magic Quadrant for Digital Experience Platforms.

In 2024, Kentico appeared as a Leader in G2’s Grid Report for Digital Experience Platforms based on user-submitted reviews.
