= Vesess =

Sri Lankan design and technology company

- Company type: Private
- Industry: Software; Web
- Founded: March 4, 2004; 21 years ago in Colombo, Sri Lanka
- Founders: Lankitha Wimalarathna; Prabhath Sirisena
- Headquarters: Colombo, Sri Lanka
- Area served: Worldwide
- Products: Hiveage; Vgo
- Services: Web design; Web development; Web strategy; Software development; Mobile application development; Software as a service
- Website: vesess.com

Vesess is a design and technology company founded in Sri Lanka in 2004. It was incorporated in United States as Vesess Inc. in 2007.

It provides consultancy services in web design and development, UI and UX design, and online strategy.

Vesess also develops and manages a software-as-a-service product: the online invoicing and billing service Hiveage.

== Products ==
=== CurdBee ===
CurdBee was an online invoicing software initially developed as an in-house PHP application to invoice clients of Vesess. A public version was developed using Ruby on Rails and launched in June 2008. It was the first step for Vesess in moving from being a web design agency to a product company.

CurdBee was mainly used by small businesses and freelancers. It had a free plan which supported unlimited invoicing and unlimited clients, with PayPal and Google Checkout as payment gateways. Paid plans had additional features such as multiple payment gateways, recurring invoices, time and expense tracking and custom domains. CurdBee was discontinued in 2014.

=== Hiveage ===
Hiveage is an invoicing and billing software-as-a-service that replaced CurdBee in 2014. Like its predecessor, Hiveage started as a freemium service, but changed to a fixed plan pricing strategy in September 2016. It inherited the CurdBee user base, and has grown to cover more than 140 countries.

=== Vgo ===
Vgo was a Software as a service launched by Vesess in September 2015, designed for taxi and logistics companies to compete with other vehicle for hire companies such as Uber. It had a web-based management application that supports online booking, automatic and manual dispatching, fleet, staff and customer management, and detailed reporting. Vgo also had set of mobile applications for customers with smartphones to submit orders, and for drivers to be notified of assignments and track their trips.

Vesess and a group of angel investors led by Just In Time Group had invested $1 million into Vgo.

Vgo was discontinued in August 2016.
