= Neuroflash =

German AI company

neuroflash
- Type: Private
- Industry: Artificial Intelligence, Content Creation
- Founded: 2021
- Founder: Jens Windel Jonathan Mall, Henrik Roth, Henrik Buning
- Headquarters: Hamburg, Germany
- Number of employees: 32
- Website: neuroflash.com

neuroflash is a German-based company that specializes in the development of AI-driven content creation software. The company was founded in 2021, by a team of experts in neuropsychology, data sciences, and artificial intelligence. By incorporating neuropsychological insights, neuroflash seeks to advance content creation in the marketing industry, assisting businesses in producing more engaging content.

== History ==
neuroflash was founded in 2021 in Hamburg, Germany, by Jens Windel, Jonathan Mall, Henrik Roth, and Henrik Büning. The founders initially aimed to create a proprietary software application that could predict the effectiveness of words. However, they soon realized the potential of their expertise to help companies create high-quality content using AI technology. This led them to develop an innovative content creation software that quickly gained recognition in the industry. In March 2022, the company secured 800,000 euros in a financing round. In February 2023, neuroflash was awarded by OMR Reviews as the leading AI Text Generator.

== Software ==
The company's primary product is an AI-powered content creation software developed to assist businesses in generating various types of content, such as company presentations, website content, and social media posts. The software offers a diverse range of text types and templates, which contribute to producing content with a credible and genuine writing style. Furthermore, neuroflash provides AI image generation, SEO analysis, and AI chat services. According to the founding team, one of the key purposes of neuroflash is to provide a German-language alternative to ChatGPT.

neuroflash emphasizes the role of neuropsychology and its impact on purchasing behavior. According to the company's founders, unconscious buying behavior can be influenced by segregated communication, and their software aids companies in creating content that directly addresses the target audience's subconscious mind. This method ensures that the AI-generated content is customized to optimize its effectiveness on the intended audience.
