= Asset and Content Management =

Asset and Content Management may refer to:

- Asset management
- Content management
