= Constitutional Forum =

Defunct constitutional reform website

- Founded: 2002
- Dissolved: 9 September 2003
- Website: www.xianzheng.net

The Constitutional Forum, whose domain name was xianzheng.net, was a Mainland China-based academic thought forum dedicated to constitutional theory and China's constitutional transformation, with constitutionalism as its core content. It was founded in 2002, and Chen Yongmiao was its webmaster. The site was banned several times by the Chinese government.

== Shut down ==
On September 9, 2003, Beijing telecommunications regulators ordered the shutdown of the Constitutional Forum for posting articles about political and constitutional reforms.
