= Zesty.io =

Web content management system

- Zesty.io Logo
- Type: Private
- Industry: Software as a Service, Content Management Systems
- Founded: 2010
- Headquarters: San Diego, California
- Key people: Randy Apuzzo (Founder, CEO, CTO)

Zesty.io is a SaaS cloud-based web content management system that allows companies (specifically mid-market and enterprise brands) to create, deploy, maintain, and optimize enterprise web properties. It is built on globally available Google Cloud Platform infrastructure and, as a SaaS product, requires no hardware or software resources. Zesty.io also allows for collaborative website building and enables users to manage multiple web properties from a single portal.

== History ==
Founders Randy Apuzzo and Andy Fleming created Zesty.io as a way to "meet the unique needs of businesses, but also to address the changing needs of the web development community." Headquartered in San Diego, Apuzzo and his team at Variable Action built Zesty.io to solve what they perceived to be a recurring problem for businesses’ web presence. After three years in private development, Zesty.io made its official debut in 2010.

Early investors of Zesty.io include Andy Ballester, co-founder of GoFundMe; Taner Halicioglu, co-founder of Seed San Diego and creator of Facebook hardware infrastructure; and Dave Hagewood, CEO of Psyonix and creator of popular game publisher Rocket League. Zesty.io has also earned startup acceleration grants from Google.

In December 2017, Zesty.io announced a raise of $1.5M led by ClearVision Equity Partners, a micro-cap equity firm.

At that same time, Gerry Widmer became CEO of Zesty.io while its co-founder Apuzzo transitioned into the Chief Technical Officer (CTO) role. Zesty.io has raised $2.8 million in funding total. Widmer, who joined Zesty.io in 2015, was previously general manager of BlueHornet, an enterprise software-as-a-service email platform and division of then-publicly traded company Digital River.

== Platform ==
Zesty.io allows content to be managed as itself (function as a headless CMS). Zesty.io can also power web properties. Content managed in a Zesty.io instance can be delivered to multiple devices with different screen sizes and display optimally. The platform creates responsive enterprise websites that are automatically optimized for search engines.

Zesty.io also supports multisite management. The multisite view allows users to manage multiple instances from one portal. The platform deploys web properties to cloud infrastructure and a global Content Distribution Network. Zesty.io's multisite supports functionality for users to share media within and among instances and web properties, as well as duplicate, share, and repurpose templates.

Zesty.io multi site management integrates with major analytics platforms such as Google Analytics to provide multi-site traffic analytics, user behavior tracking, as well as the ability to export data collected to other marketing platforms.

== Deployment and Support ==
Because Zesty.io is a cloud platform, updates deploy automatically as new releases become available. As a SaaS platform, it is "versionless and infrastructure-less." Deployment of new language, platform or infrastructure changes, and feature updates are automatic as well.

== Security ==
Zesty.io runs on a multi-tenant cloud infrastructure with a global content delivery network. The infrastructure is built on Google Cloud Platform along with a global CDN hosted with Fastly. It uses a closed-source code base and cloud infrastructure is designed to protect front-facing web content from hackers and DDoS attacks. DDoS mitigation is delivered through Fastly or CloudFlare's content delivery network. Google Cloud Platform loadbalancers use anycast to distribute traffic to nearby servers, which greatly diffuses the potency of DDoS attacks by preventing the attackers from focusing their traffic on a single system on the Internet. For security purposes, users have the options to enable two-factor authentication powered by Twilio’s 2FA product Authy, as well as the ability to create and designate specific admin permissions and controls.

== Templating language ==
Zesty.io uses templating language Parsley. Parsley is used to power Zesty.io's schema based contextual coding. Parsley is used to create the presentation layer, and run routing for websites. It includes a full API Index. Similar to other templating languages, Parsley uses double French brackets, {{ }}, to open and close template expressions. Inside these brackets, a developer can use Parsley functions, reference content schema properties, and write JavaScript statements. These templating expressions are written alongside standard HTML. Parsley works to optimize each call and statement to expedite loading times for content on Zesty.io even though it is dynamic.
