= Web content =

Content encountered as part of the user experience on websites

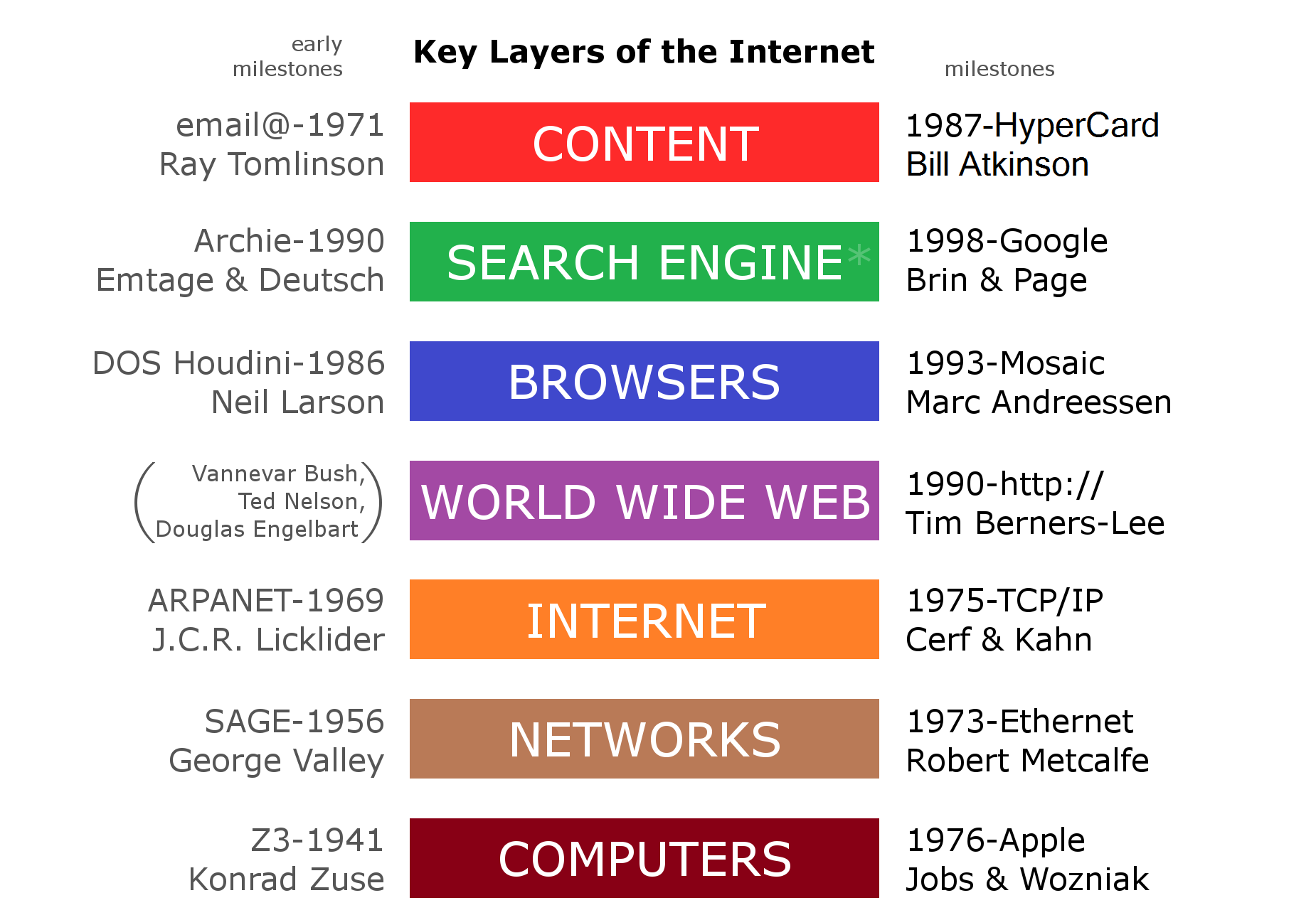
Users connect their computers to web content via various layers of the internet

Web content is the text, visual or audio content that is made available online and user encountered as part of the online usage and experience on websites. It may include text, images, sounds and audio, online videos, among other items placed within web pages.

In the book Information Architecture for the World Wide Web, Lou Rosenfeld and Peter Morbid wrote, "We define content broadly as 'the stuff in your website.' Web content may include webpage document pages, information, software data and applications, e-services, images, audio and video files, personal Web pages, archived e-mail messages stored on email servers, and more. And we include future web content as well as present web content roadmap."

== Content management ==
Because of website complexity "content management systems" started to emerge in the mid-1990s as a tool with which to manage and organize the content on a website. Content management often means that within a business there is a range of people who have distinct roles to do with content management, such as content author, editor, publisher, and administrator. But it also means there may be a content management system whereby each of the different roles is organized to provide their assistance in operating the system and organizing the information for a website. A business may also employ various content protection measures, which are typically technologies used to attempt to frustrate copying without permission.

== Web content accessibility ==
Web content accessibility is the practice of designing and developing web content that can be used by people with a wide range of disabilities. The Web Content Accessibility Guidelines (WCAG), developed by the World Wide Web Consortium (W3C), provide comprehensive recommendations structured around four principles: perceivability, operability, understandability, and robustness. These guidelines define success criteria at three levels of conformance (A, AA, and AAA) to help ensure content is accessible across diverse devices and user needs. Common accessibility challenges include providing text alternatives for non-text content, ensuring keyboard navigability, maintaining sufficient color contrast, and creating predictable navigation structures. Adherence to WCAG facilitates legal compliance in many countries and promotes a user-friendly web environment for all users, supporting inclusivity and equal access.

== See also ==
- Hypermedia
- Content (media)
- Content farm
- Content management
- Digital marketing
- Dynamic web page
- Mobile content
- Separation of content and presentation
- Site map
- Tim Berners-Lee
- Web content lifecycle
- Web content management
- Web design
- Web development
- Web document
- Web service
- Web resource
- Web syndication
- Web template
- Webmaster
- Website governance
- World Wide Web Consortium (Web standards)
