= RSTV =

RSTV or RStV may refer to:

- Rajya Sabha TV, Indian television channel owned and operated by Rajya Sabha
- Rivers State Television, television station in Port Harcourt city, Rivers State, Nigeria
- Redemption Song (TV series), American reality television show
- Rundfunkstaatsvertrag, abbreviated as RStV, nationwide law for radio station and television licensing in Germany
