= Kontent.ai =

Headless content management system platform

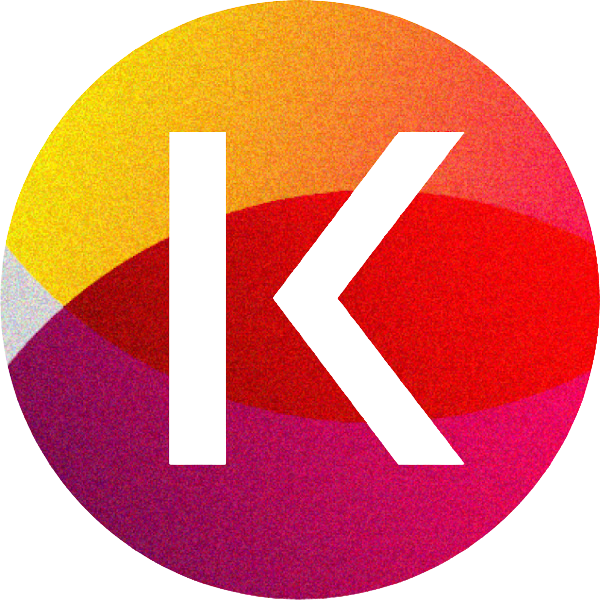
- Developer(s): Kontent.ai
- Initial release: 2015; 10 years ago
- Stable release: Ongoing (SaaS platform)
- Written in: C#
- Operating system: Cloud-based
- Type: Headless CMS, Content management system
- License: Proprietary (SaaS)
- Website: kontent.ai

Kontent.ai is a headless content management system used to create websites and applications. It is a software-as-a-service (SaaS) platform with APIs to retrieve and manage content and SDKs.

== History ==
Kontent.ai was started as a business unit of Kentico Software in 2015 in Brno by Petr Palas. The internal start-up focused on the CMS market resulted in the launch of Kentico Draft in 2016 and was relaunched as Kentico Cloud in 2017. In 2019, it was rebranded to Kentico Kontent. In 2022, the team decided to operate as a standalone company and after raising $40 million in growth capital, became Kontent.ai. It was recognized as one of 31 leading Agile CMS providers in 2022. It was also named a leader in the Headless CMS Grid on G2 Crowd platform as well as recognized in Gartner’s Market Guide for Web Content Management 2022. Kontent.ai became a certified member of the MACH Alliance in November 2022.

Kontent.ai operates as a standalone company with 5 offices located in New York, London, Amsterdam, Brno and Sydney. Petr Palas, the company’s founder, is the CEO. It's the first certified headless CMS product on the Azure Marketplace. Kontent.ai functions as a headless content management system for the development of websites and applications across platforms, including smartphones, wearable devices, virtual assistants, and other digital interfaces. It also features APIs and SDKs.

Kontent.ai is used by organizations in various sectors, including industries with regulatory requirements such as insurance and healthcare.
