= Creads =

Creads is a French company that developed and operates an online marketplace for graphic design and other creative services. Founded in 2008 by Julien Mechin and Ronan Pelloux, the company has 35 employees and a network of 50,000 freelance designers. The marketplace functions using a tendering process whereby freelancers subscribe to the site free of charge, then apply for projects posted by companies and/or individuals looking for creative services. Services from various types of freelancers are offered: graphic designers, webmasters, copywriters, illustrators, motion designers, etc.

== History ==
Whilst studying at ESCP Europe in 2008, Julien Mechin and Ronan Pelloux began working on a course-related project. Being in need of a graphic designer to produce a logo as part of the project launch, they had difficulty finding one directly and did not want to pay a fee to an agency for the service. This gave them the idea create an online marketplace that would put clients and designers in touch with each other. Creads (taken from a French word play on ‘creation of ads’) is the name of the company they founded to make this product.

By 2012, Creads passed the 200,000 mark for projects posted on its site. At the same time, Creads created an advertising award called the ‘Grand Prix de l’Affichage Indoor’ competition. Presided over by Jacques Séguéla, the jury comprises 10 experts sourced from various fields - marketing, communication, journalism, advertising and promotions: François LAURENT (Co-President ADETEM), Stéphane MARTIN (Director at l’ARPP), Olivier MONGEAU (Editor in Chief at STRATEGIES), Maxime BARBIER (MinuteBuzz blogger), Beatrice SUTTER (Editor for DOC NEWS), Isabelle MUSNIK (Managing Editor at INFLUENCIA), Mathieu FLAIG (Le Publigeekaire blogger), Jacques SIMONET (Editor at InterMédia), Julien MECHIN (Co-founder of CREADS), Ronan PELLOUX (Co-founder of CREADS) et Guillaume GUTTIN (Founder of COM’UNIQUE).

By 2013, 50,000 freelance designers had subscribed. A new service was added whereby companies could select designers on demand.

Creads has developed a crowd sourcing ethical charter aimed at designers and advertisers.

=== Raising capital ===
In the first half of 2014, CM-CIC Capital Privé (a subsidiary of two French banks, Credit Mutuel and CIC), which specializes in the financing of technology-based companies, bought a 3 million Euro stake in the company. Following this investment, Hi Innov and later Pleïade Venture took a participation too.

== Corporate structure ==
- Creads International: platform that puts brands in contact with designers.
- Creads Partners : creative design studio

== Board ==
- Cedric Gourbault, Associate Director at Creads.
- Julien Mechin, Associate Director at Creads.
- Martin Genot, co-founder Photoways-Photobox.
- Christopher Caussin.
