= Content designer =

A content designer is a type of designer that shapes user-centered content, emphasizing clarity, consistency, and usability to help users complete tasks and move through a product or service effectively.

The role involves understanding user needs and applying design thinking to decide how information is structured and communicated.

== Content design in government ==
Content designers working for government have to explain complicated information as clearly as possible. It is a form of User centred design.

Content design is not editorial writing. According to Sarah Winters (was Richards) of Content Design London:

If you approach a new piece of web content with ‘how shall I write this?’, that’s writing or editorial. If you approach it from ‘how am I going to get this across to the audience in the best way possible?’, that’s content design.

Content designers use data and testing to understand what people need and then try to meet those needs. This can help citizens understand their rights and obligations, and use government services.

Content designers structure and clarify information to ensure it is discoverable, comprehensible, and universally accessible

Content designer is a defined role in the UK government civil service and in the Australian government. In the UK government:

Content designers are responsible for creating, updating and reviewing content around the end-to-end user journey and are comfortable using evidence, data and research.

In Singapore, the Design Skills Framework includes the roles of Content writer and Content strategist, rather than a Content designer.

== Content design in marketing ==
Content designers are often involved in online marketing, and usually focus on animated graphics, texts, videos, and sound depending on the message and the target audience. Most content designers produce their own content from scratch and work on their project individually, often using social media. The duties of a content designer vary, depending on the type of company, and the projects they are developing. The format of the content usually specifies a more specific title such as animator for motion graphics, writer for textual content, instructional designer for educational content, or a programmer for automated program/data-driven content. Most content designers must create or draw original work which is relevant to a specific topic or message they wish to communicate. A function of this job type is being able to adapt to new advances in coding and design. Content designers also create new codes and templates, and often keep themselves updated by acquiring new technical skills.

== Web developer vs. web designer ==
Content designers who specialize in programming might deliberate the role of a web developer versus web designer. Web developers deal with the non-design aspect of building websites, which includes coding and writing markup and site hierarchy, including: client-side coding, server-side coding, and database technology. Web developers require a more intense education than web designers in order to create a website. Generally, web developers excel at coding and the technical aspects of web programming. Web designers create content, whereas web developers must create code that is easy to read; together they create user-friendly, and an overall enjoyable experience for the user to navigate.

Web designers use graphics and graphic design software to create visuals for a website. They then use coding to make it available online. Designers are creative and use both intuition and imagination. However, web designers express more concern with the look of a website than how technically sound it is. They often rely on a web developer to build a website from the ground up and know all the specific languages for that website.

Overall, the online representation of businesses through websites, enabled by web development, has influenced modern society. Web development provides a platform for online marketing, allowing businesses to reach a global audience. Millions of users engage with businesses online through websites and digital platforms.

Web design and development influence. the usability, appearance, and functionality of websites. Website designs are often updated over time to reflect changes in technology, user expectations, and accessibility standards.

== See also ==
- Communication design
- Content management
- Content strategy
- Copywriter
- Graphic designer
- Interaction design
- Service design
- Technical writer
- User centred design
- User experience design
