= Hiveage =

Invoicing and billing software as a service

- Developer: Vesess
- Release: 2014
- Available in: English
- Type: Software as a service
- Website: www.hiveage.com

Hiveage is an invoicing and billing software as a service developed and launched by Vesess Inc. in 2014, and was converted to Hiveage Inc. in 2019. It is the successor to CurdBee, launched by Vesess in 2008. Hiveage has a user base covering more than 140 countries.

== Features ==
Hiveage supports unlimited invoicing for unlimited clients. Other features include estimates/quotations, time, expense and mileage tracking, recurring and auto-billing, team and access management, and managing multiple businesses with a single account. Hiveage has integrations with several online payment gateways, including PayPal, Stripe, Square, Authorize.net, Braintree, WePay and 2Checkout, and supports ACH payments via Authorize.net.. In 2015, Hiveage integrated with Bitcoin.

=== Pricing ===
Hiveage started as a freemium service, but changed to a fixed plan pricing strategy in September 2016. During the time it functioned as a freemium service, Hiveage had a free plan which supported unlimited invoicing and unlimited clients, with PayPal as the payment gateway, and a modular pricing scheme which allowed users to selectively add more features.

In 2020, as a response to the economic downturn brought on by the COVID-19 pandemic, Hiveage re-launched a free plan that supported up to 5 clients.

== Paylinks ==
Paylinks is a mobile app launched by Hiveage in 2020, aimed at small businesses that want to sell products and services without the need for dedicated E-commerce or POS systems. Paylinks generates web links and QR codes, which can be shared with customers via social media, messaging apps, SMS, or email. The customer can then follow the link or scan the QR code to visit a custom-generated online checkout page, where they can make the payment using PayPal or Stripe. It is available on iOS and Android platforms.

== CurdBee ==
CurdBee was initially developed by Vesess as an in-house PHP application to invoice clients. The public version was developed using Ruby on Rails and launched on 17 June 2008. It was mainly used by small businesses and freelancers.

CurdBee had a free plan which supported unlimited invoicing and unlimited clients, with PayPal and Google Checkout as payment gateways. Paid plans had additional features such as multiple payment gateways, recurring invoices, time and expense tracking and custom domains.
