= Depublizieren =

Removal of published content in websites

Depublizieren is the process of removing websites from publicly accessible areas, which the online services (Telemedia) of the public broadcasters in Germany began in the summer of 2009 for their archive holdings and, since September 1, 2010, also for current reporting after a period of generally seven days. Websites that have been removed by the Interstate Broadcasting Agreement (RStV) do not have to be deleted but are no longer publicly accessible.

According to ARD, Germany's process for depublizieren public service websites is the most complex in the world. Although the BBC has also reduced its online services to justify its license fee funding, the Public-Value-Test used in the UK - the model for the German three-step test - only applies to major projects. In contrast to the German broadcasters, the ORF refrains from a retrospective review of existing offerings. Estimates of the total volume of older public service Internet content that has been decommissioned are more than one million online documents.

The term "depublizieren" or "depublication" is also used when controversial or erroneous online content is removed from the publicly accessible area. It is also used for private media.

== Concept ==
Depublizieren is a neologism from the word publication (publish, from Latin publicus, public) and the Latin prefix de- ("off", " gone", "down", "miss"). The term, which is not used on a legal basis, was hardly used before 2010. Earlier definitions of depublizieren as "unpublishing" referred to the removal of factually incorrect content from the Internet without comment instead of correction or, as a technical term, to the withdrawal of a contribution visible on a website without its deletion from the repository. Technically, the latter meaning corresponds to using the term in the discussion about depublishing public Internet content.

The formation of the term contains a paradoxical element, as the terms "publishing" or " publicizing" do not actually permit this form of formation of antonyms: a statement made to the public by publication cannot be retracted by not continuing to disseminate it, but only by revocating it. Therefore, a person harmed by untrue media reports can regularly assert a claim for a right of reply or rectification (→ right to rectification).

However, such a corrective revocation is not meant when depublishing public service content. The use of the term by the employees and committees of public broadcasters responsible for the organization of depublizieren made the term a buzzword in the summer of 2010, which, due to its contradictory nature, tends to criticize the removal of websites (→ Reactions section). What is published on the internet cannot be taken back; this is conceptually "silly" and a "fight against windmills" (Johnny Haeusler). Depublizieren was named early on as a possible un-word of the year 2010.

Outside public broadcasting, depublizieren is also used more generally for:

- Removing controversial, erroneous, or legally problematic online content.
- Taking down articles or posts from private media sites, blogs, or other platforms.

It is roughly equivalent to the English terms “unpublish,” “depublish,” “take offline,” or “remove from public access.”

== Previous history ==
Broadcasting financing models in Europe: TV licence Television licence and advertising Television licence, advertising and government grants No TV licence but a specific tax Tax on electricity bill, advertising and other taxes Tax on electricity bill and advertising Specific tax (even if you do not have a TV), state funding and advertising Specific tax (even if you do not have a TV) and advertising Specific tax (even if you do not have a TV) No TV licence State funding and advertising State funding only Other No public TV, commercial only Unknown

In 2003, the German Association of Private Broadcasters and Telemedia (VPRT) filed a complaint with the European Commission, describing the broadcast receiving license as illegal state aid under Article § 87 EG (in German) paragraph 1 of the Treaty of Rome (EGV) - now Article 107 paragraph 1 of the TFEU Treaty. This funding distorts competition and puts private companies at a disadvantage, especially since public broadcasters do not have a narrowly defined functional mandate for their activities, especially in the online sector. Although the federal states and the broadcasters themselves had never considered the financing of the fees as a state subsidy, the EU Commission followed the VPRT's interpretation and demanded that this aid be abolished or that the exemption criteria of Article

§ 86 EG (in German)

paragraph 2 of the Treaty of Rome (EGV) be fulfilled. An open conflict arose in the summer of 2007:

"When ARD published its digital strategy in mid-June 2007, its plans to significantly expand its online activities and digital offerings were met with fierce protests from its private competitors, both the Association of Private Broadcasting and Telemedia (VPRT) and the Federal Association of German Newspaper Publishers/Federal Association of German Newspaper Publishers (BDZV), whose members want to operate (online) television themselves in future."

However, Article 5 of the Basic Law for the Federal Republic of Germany guarantees "freedom of the press and freedom of reporting through broadcasting and film", and although public service broadcasting is not explicitly mentioned there, this includes its reporting and press products. On September 11, 2007, the Federal Constitutional Court stated that the mandate of public service broadcasting also extends to new digital offerings and contains a "development guarantee" (already stated in earlier broadcasting rulings by the court). According to this, public service broadcasting is to ensure the diversity of offerings and the reliability of information on the internet - it is attributed a "genuine online mandate". "The Supreme Court's ruling on fees was seen as a victory for public service broadcasting."

The State Aid Compromise of 2007 between the Federal Republic of Germany and the EU Commission stipulated that "the functional mandate of the public broadcasters will be sufficiently specified" by June 1, 2009, and in particular that its extension to online offerings will be defined. This compromise averted a case before the European Court of Justice, which could have "called into question the financing of broadcasting in the entire EU".

== Legal basis ==
=== Objective ===
On June 1, 2009, the 12th Amendment to the Interstate Broadcasting Treaty (12th RÄStV) came into force, with which the federal states wanted to fulfill their obligations from the State Aid Compromise and at the same time secure the constitutionally guaranteed independence of the public media.

The 12th Interstate Broadcasting Treaty (RÄStV) should fully transfer the traditional mission of the public broadcasters to the online sector, as the "density of households that are technically connected to the Internet and use Internet services" has increased considerably and the development guarantee confirmed by the Federal Constitutional Court requires this. To meet the requirements of the EU Commission, however, one aspect in particular must be taken into account:

"Similar to the previous requirement for public broadcasting, public Telemedia must also distinguish itself from commercial offerings, which are not only provided by private broadcasters but also by a large number of other market participants via the Internet."

=== Broadcasting concept ===
However, the 12th RÄStV also included a change to the definition of broadcasting. Section 2, paragraph 1, of the new RStV now states:

Broadcasting is a linear information and communication service; it is the presentation and distribution of moving images or sounds according to a broadcast schedule using electromagnetic oscillations, intended for the general public and simultaneous reception.

According to the explanatory memorandum of the 12th Interstate Broadcasting Treaty, the new aspect is "the clarification that broadcasting is a linear information and communication service. The insertion of the criterion 'for simultaneous reception' distinguishes broadcasting services from on-demand services. Simultaneous reception is also to be understood as a transmission which is subject to short delays for technical reasons alone". The linearity criterion excludes, for example, the independent presentation of user-generated content and the form of an online community. The exclusion of on-demand offerings is the basis for the definition of dwell times for public Internet offerings (→ section Dwell times). Without the broad understanding of "simultaneous", which allows for short delays "for technical reasons", this redefinition would not allow public service content to be accessed over the Internet.

In the 12th version of the RStV, which has been in force since 2009, public broadcasters are no longer allowed to offer "non-broadcast press-like offerings" and "comprehensive local reporting" according to Section 11d. This paragraph also includes an addendum with various forms of offerings that are not permitted for the online presence of public broadcasters, including, for example, file-sharing platforms, route planners, and classified ads.

=== Dwell times ===
On December 18, 2008, the state governments agreed in the 12th RÄStV that broadcasters may normally make program-related content available for seven days. According to Section 11d, Paragraph 2, RStV, exceptions apply, among other things, to soccer coverage of 1st and 2nd Bundesliga matches, which may only be available for 24 hours, and to archives "with contemporary and cultural history content", which may be online for an unlimited period.

According to the explanatory memorandum of the 12th RÄStV, "the provision of contemporary and cultural history content in the form of Telemedia corresponds to the democratic, social and cultural needs of society". The restriction of soccer coverage is justified with "higher costs for the acquisition of additional rights" for a longer on-demand option, which "should be avoided in the interest of the license fee payers".

To meet the requirements of the EU Commission about the specification of their functional mandate without interfering with their constitutional independence, the federal states prescribed the three-step test as a procedure for the public broadcasters to check the conformity of the offer with the mandate in each case. However, the decision on the continuation of old offers and the introduction of new concepts on the Internet and in broadcasting was left to the broadcasting bodies themselves, the Broadcasting Councils. These bodies also decide on the duration of online services.

== Procedure ==
=== Three-step test ===
Accordingly, the competent Broadcasting Councils (Television Council, Radio Council) decide in a five-stage procedure whether or not an offer meets the three-stage test criteria, namely

1. the extent to which the offering meets the democratic, social and cultural needs of society,
2. the extent to which the offering contributes to journalistic competition in terms of quality and
3. the financial outlay required for the offering.

— 12th RÄStV, Article 1, paragraph 12 (to § 11f, paragraph 4, RStV).

If a Broadcasting Board determines that an offering is new or substantially changed and is neither already legally required nor already legally prohibited (Phase 1), it initiates the procedure (Phase 2) based on a specific description of the offering, the central element of which is the collection of information (Phase 3), on which the Broadcasting Board's decision, including the statement of reasons (Phase 4), and the final review by the responsible state government as the legal supervisor (Phase 5) are based.

The information gathering phase includes, in particular, obtaining the views of competing suppliers and the views of independent experts on the impact of the proposed transaction on competition. Comments and economic data from private competitors (which are taken into account in the procedure but are not published) could, for example, state that "offers already on the market will be completely crowded out", which would affect the second three-step test criterion. However, according to the three-step test, the determination of the "democratic, social and cultural needs of society" and the quality of a service in terms of journalistic competition are also important elements in answering the question of whether or not a specific service falls within the remit of public service broadcasting. Only after all of this has been weighed against the costs of a service can a broadcasting council decide on the admissibility of an offer, justify its decision and pass it on to the respective state government responsible for legal supervision: The legal supervision checks compliance with the procedural rules, but does not make its assessment of the content (otherwise it would be a constitutionally inadmissible "technical supervision" in the broadcasting sector).

The results of the subsequent three-stage tests for the existing offerings were published in summer 2010. Saarland Broadcasting, among others, summarized the considerations on media use on which its dwell time concept was based:

"Viewers and listeners use media libraries to rewatch or replay shows and program segments. They select functions such as the program calendar or "Missed a Show?" or search for access via the familiar station brand. Based on the culturally 'learned' broadcasting week, the so-called 'seven-day catch-up' has established itself as the minimum supply period in many European countries, especially with regard to video use. [...] While this type of use is based on the pattern of using linear media in a so-called lean-back posture, an Internet-specific use of image, text and multimedia content has established itself in parallel, which has no reference to broadcasting weeks or program calendars and corresponds to an active lean-forward posture. This content is often accessed via search functions or researched by topic. As a rule, it is provided in multimedia combinations of various web-specific forms of presentation in Telemedia."

Because of this distinction between two usage patterns, public broadcasters typically make a large portion of their online offerings available for seven days (lean-back approach) and another portion for a longer period, such as a year (lean-forward approach).

== Reactions ==
Following the adoption of the 12th RÄStV, there were several media debates in 2009 and 2010 about the three-step tests and the resulting restrictions on public online offerings. Private media companies and publishers' associations were less critical of ZDF than of ARD, which is much more complexly organized with a total of 37 three-stage tests. During this period, representatives of public and private media often met in panel discussions. The new legal regulations were criticized with combative terms such as "Morgenthau Plan" or "censorship", while private publishers often used the catchword "electronic press" for the online offerings of the broadcasters.

After the completion of the Telemedia concepts in the summer of 2010, the length of time that various television genres remained in the media libraries and the deletion of online contributions became much-discussed topics "that arouse the ire of Internet users and are ostentatiously regretted by those responsible at the broadcasters. Like some ARD broadcasters, ZDF announced the removal of about 80 percent of its online content, which it estimated at 93,500 individual documents. ZDF director-general Markus Schächter said he hoped this would put an end to the debate about public broadcasters' online activities:

"The interests of publishers and commercial broadcasters have been taken very much into account. At the same time, the review has shown that the impact of our offerings on the business models of commercial broadcasters is marginal."

Some politicians are also critical of depublizieren, with the SPD in Saarland and the Pirate Party in Brandenburg both rejecting it in their manifestos. In January 2013, the Internet and Digital Society Study Commission (EIDG) of the German Parliament, consisting of 17 experts and 17 members of parliament from all parties, explicitly recommended the abolition of the depublizieren obligation stipulated in the Interstate Broadcasting Treaty. Representatives of the governing coalition, however, only wanted the seven-day rule to be lifted for offerings that represent a "qualitative added value" compared to existing offerings from private providers.

=== Biased reports ===
When the first articles disappeared from their online offerings, the editorial teams of the public broadcasters were initially confronted with questions about the supposed deletion of websites. They used the term depublizieren to explain the process and to clarify the difference with the deletion of websites, and were confronted with critical opinions from the public, which had already been anticipated in public statements:

"Many users are outraged that content created and published with their broadcast fees will no longer be available as of September 1, 2010."

The coverage of the three-stage review process was so negative in the spring of 2010 that the Conference of Commission Chairmen of the Association of State Media Authorities felt compelled to complain about the poor quality of reporting. Among other things, "abbreviated, incorrect and one-sided" reports were made from confidential documents, giving "the impression that the committees are avoiding transparency in a quasi-autocratic and interest-driven manner. At the same time, however, the influence of lobbying by publishers and private broadcasters has already been pointed out, in whose interests the extensive curtailment of public service online activities is taking place, although they are not satisfied with the result. In the spring of 2010, media journalist Stefan Niggemeier drew attention to the conflict of interest between private media providers and public service media, which has led to biased reporting by both groups.

The most critical coverage of the depublizieren that began in the summer after the Telemedia concepts were decided on largely corresponded to the relationship of the depublizieren editors to their work, as Niggemeier made clear in one of the first newspaper reports entitled Depublizieren:

"But there is a lot of frustration among editors - and concern about how something like this changes the relationship with the medium of the Internet. [...] One colleague fears that if only a limited amount of content is allowed online anyway, the willingness to produce complex content in the first place could diminish."

The public broadcasters' reporting therefore also expressed their dissatisfaction with the depublizieren process and referred to the broadcasters' legal obligation to do so. Following accusations by the BDZV that the depublizieren of ARD online content did not go far enough and was, therefore, a farce, ARD Chairman Peter Boudgoust summarized that ARD had depublished more than one million Internet pages, including around 80 percent of the original pages of tagesschau.de. ARD had not wanted this procedure, but had "complied with applicable law in its implementation". Unfortunately, it was "primarily the users who had to pay the price". In July 2010, at the same time as the decision-making phase for the Telemedia concepts, the now defunct website www.depublizieren.de was created as a protest against depublizieren, containing a fictitious death notice for "Die Publizierung".

Representatives of private media groups also expressed mild criticism of the three-step test, describing it as a "relatively pointless procedure". The removed content meant that "no publisher earned a single euro more". RTL Group announced that it was "still considering legal action against some online publications of ARD and ZDF".

=== Depub.org ===
Headline of the former depublizieren protest website depub.org, September 2010

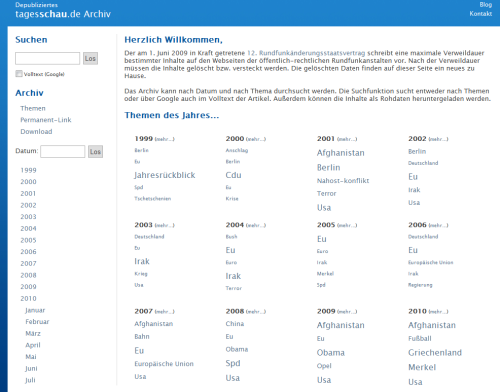
Screenshot of the depub.org presentation of the archive (1999–2010) from tagesschau.de in September 2010

The depublizieren of public Internet content received a new wave of public attention after the implementation of concepts developed for this purpose in September 2010: After an archive of tagesschau.de articles written between 1999 and 2010 had already been offered on the BitTorrent download portal The Pirate Bay in July 2010, the website depub.org put preparation of this archived content online for free retrieval on August 20, 2010, so that users could similarly access the articles to the version on tagesschau.de before depublication. The offer also included the function of continuously archiving current articles from tagesschau.de and making them available on depub.org. Thus, depub.org also acted as a mirror for some articles that had not yet been depublished by tagesschau.de.

Numerous German-language media reported on depub.org, especially from mid-September 2010, emphasizing that depub.org was "trying to get hold of the already deleted content of other public media" and relying on the help of their editors: "We are confident that there are also people in the other newsrooms who do not want the articles to disappear from the web." Robin Meyer-Lucht quoted an NDR spokesperson: "NDR will take legal action against Depub.org if possible. Indications of a possible unauthorized republication of depublished tagesschau.de content had already come from the editorial team itself in July 2010. Depub.org claimed to have asked the editorial team before republishing the tagesschau.de content. The response from the editorial team warned: "that an archive could affect the copyrights of third parties, such as agencies or photographers, and that it is therefore at our own risk to operate such an archive." According to the response, depub.org "has reason to believe that the Tagesschau.de editorial team has no major problems with the archive.

depub.org announced archives for all ARD broadcasters (except SR).

Zeit editor Kai Biermann described the depub.org campaign as civil courage in the "public interest," even though it was illegal. Depublication, on the other hand, is "an expression of the egoistic interests of private companies. Due to the method of "calculated law breaking for idealistic reasons", the depub.org activists were often accused of being "Robin Hoods".

Depub.org announced its intention to set up archives for the public Internet offerings br-online.de, hr-online.de, mdr.de, ndr.de, rbb-online.de, radiobremen.de, swr.de, wdr.de and heute.de. Publicly available articles would be stored for this purpose. For content that has already been published, however, the company relies on editors to provide archive data.

Dagmar Gräfin Kerssenbrock, a CDU politician from Schleswig-Holstein and chairwoman of the NDR broadcasting council, called depub.org "an example of the creative anarchy on the Internet" and of the great interest in the content of tagesschau.de. Therefore, "there will always be people who find a way to make this content available. Sites like depub.org are proof of the dubious nature of the three-step test. The Tagesschau online editorial team suspects that the contents of the anonymously registered domain depub.org in Canada were collected while the articles, which have now been published, were still publicly accessible. However, according to tagesschau.de editor-in-chief Jörg Sadrozinski, the illegal use of tagesschau.de articles by depub.org could lead to "politicians or lobbyists in publishing houses realizing that such measures are simply pointless, that the Internet never forgets".

When the depub.org domain became unavailable in mid-October 2010, the service moved to depub.info for a short time. However, this site was soon unavailable as well. Between November 10, 2010, and July 13, 2011, when a Twitter message was sent to the tagesschau.de archive, there were no public messages from the depub.org activists.

=== Evaluation & Berlin requirements 2014 ===
On July 1, 2014, the Berlin House of Deputies called on the Senate to review the practice, which had been in place for five years, and to abolish the obligation to depublish.

Netzpolitik.org reported in 2017 that it was "difficult to explain to viewers why contributions financed by the general public should not be permanently available". The vast majority of federal states are in favor of abolition.

=== Reform concept of the ZDF ===
Since May 2019, public broadcasters have been allowed to develop new digital offerings, provided they are based on a concept approved by the supervisory bodies.

The ZDF presented a reform concept for this in 2019. According to this concept, contemporary and cultural history archives with informative, educational, and cultural telemedia will be offered for an unlimited period. On the other hand, educational content from the fields of science, technology, theology or ethics, political education, the environment, work, and social affairs, as well as cultural content that documents cultural achievements in their social context, will be discontinued after five years.

A total of 17 comments were received by the deadline of October 28. In a joint open letter to the ZDF Television Council, the GEW trade union, the German Library Association, and Wikimedia, among others, called for a rethink. This reform concept would not do justice to "the important role of public broadcasting in the German educational landscape of the 21st century".
