= Web content development =

Process for web production

Web content development is the process of researching, writing, gathering, organizing, and editing information for publication on websites. Website content may consist of prose, graphics, pictures, recordings, movies, or other digital assets that could be distributed by a hypertext transfer protocol server, and viewed by a web browser.

== Web developers and content developers ==
When the World Wide Web began, web developers either developed online content themselves, or modified existing documents and coded them into hypertext markup language (HTML). In time, the field of website development came to encompass many technologies, so it became difficult for website developers to maintain so many different skills.

Content developers are specialized website developers who have content generation skills such as graphic design, multimedia development, professional writing, and documentation. They can integrate content into new or existing websites without using information technology skills such as script language programming and database programming.

Content developers or technical content developers can also be technical writers who produce technical documentation that helps people understand and use a product or service. This documentation includes online help, manuals, white papers, design specifications, developer guides, deployment guides, release notes, etc.

== Search engine optimization ==
Content developers may also be search engine optimization specialists, or internet marketing professionals. High quality, unique content is what search engines are looking for. Content development specialists, therefore, have a very important role to play in the search engine optimization process. One issue currently plaguing the world of web content development is keyword-stuffed content which are prepared solely for the purpose of manipulating search engine rankings. The effect is that content is written to appeal to search engine (algorithms) rather than human readers. Google recommends creating helpful, reliable, people-first content rather than content designed primarily to manipulate search rankings. Its spam policies identify practices such as keyword stuffing and link spam as attempts to manipulate search results.

== New content types ==
Web content is no longer restricted to text. Search engines now index audio/visual media, including video, images, PDFs, and other elements of a web page. Website owners sometimes use content protection networks to scan for plagiarized content.

== See also ==
- Web content
- Web content lifecycle
- Content marketing
- Search engine optimization
- Content designer
- Content management
- Content adaptation
- Professional writing
- Technical writer
- Web content management system
