= Online producer =

An online producer oversees the making of content for websites and other online properties. Online producers are sometimes called "web producers", "publishers", "content producers", or "online editors".

Online producers have a range of responsibilities. They are in charge of arranging, editing, and sometimes even creating content, which comes in various forms like writing, music, video, and Adobe Flash, for websites. Many online producers often, but not always, specialize in one particular form of web content.

The role is distinct from that of a web designer, developer, or webmaster. Online producers define and maintain the character of a website, as opposed to running it from a technical standpoint. However, technical and design knowledge is imperative for an online producer to be effective at their job. Online producers are typically responsible for working with system engineers or web designers to design site features with a user-friendly interface for smooth navigation and transitions. This means that an online producer should be familiar with common web publishing technologies such as CSS and HTML to effectively communicate with the system engineers or web designers on their teams.

Online producers may also be responsible for finding ways to boost the popularity of a website and increase user activity, particularly if the website sells advertising space. Online producers will also work with web teams to conceive, design and launch new web products such as blogs, community forums and user profiles.

Online producer roles often feature a project management component. The producer will schedule resources to create content, ensure that the content has passed Q/A on a staging server, and publish the content to the production server; keeping to a pre-defined schedule or project plan.

== Annual pay ==
The estimated annual pay for an online producer in the United States ranges from around US$42K to US$98K a year; with the current reported, average salary being around US$65K nationwide as of September 2021. However, salaries range depending upon an individual's experience and skill levels and the size of the companies hiring online producers.

== Skills and educational requirements ==
Online producers should not only be familiar with web publishing technologies, but they should also have skills in journalism, design, and marketing as the job requires aspects of all three. Writing skills and the ability to direct traffic to a website are essential to the success of an online producer, and having skills in these three subjects makes it easier to accomplish these responsibilities.

Many online producers may have a background in journalism, or often continue to work in journalism as online producers. For example, in radio or television, an online producer may work closely with an executive producer to meet a broadcast show's online needs.

A formal degree is not technically required to become an online producer; however, many universities offer web production degrees. Earning a degree in web production is a way to get a resume to stand out in the field, but experience with the necessary skills can also mean just as much.

Working hours for online producers are not static; Websites are live and issues may occur at any moment that require immediate resolving.

== See also ==
- Online journalism
- Webmaster
