= Kristina Halvorson =

American writer and entrepreneur

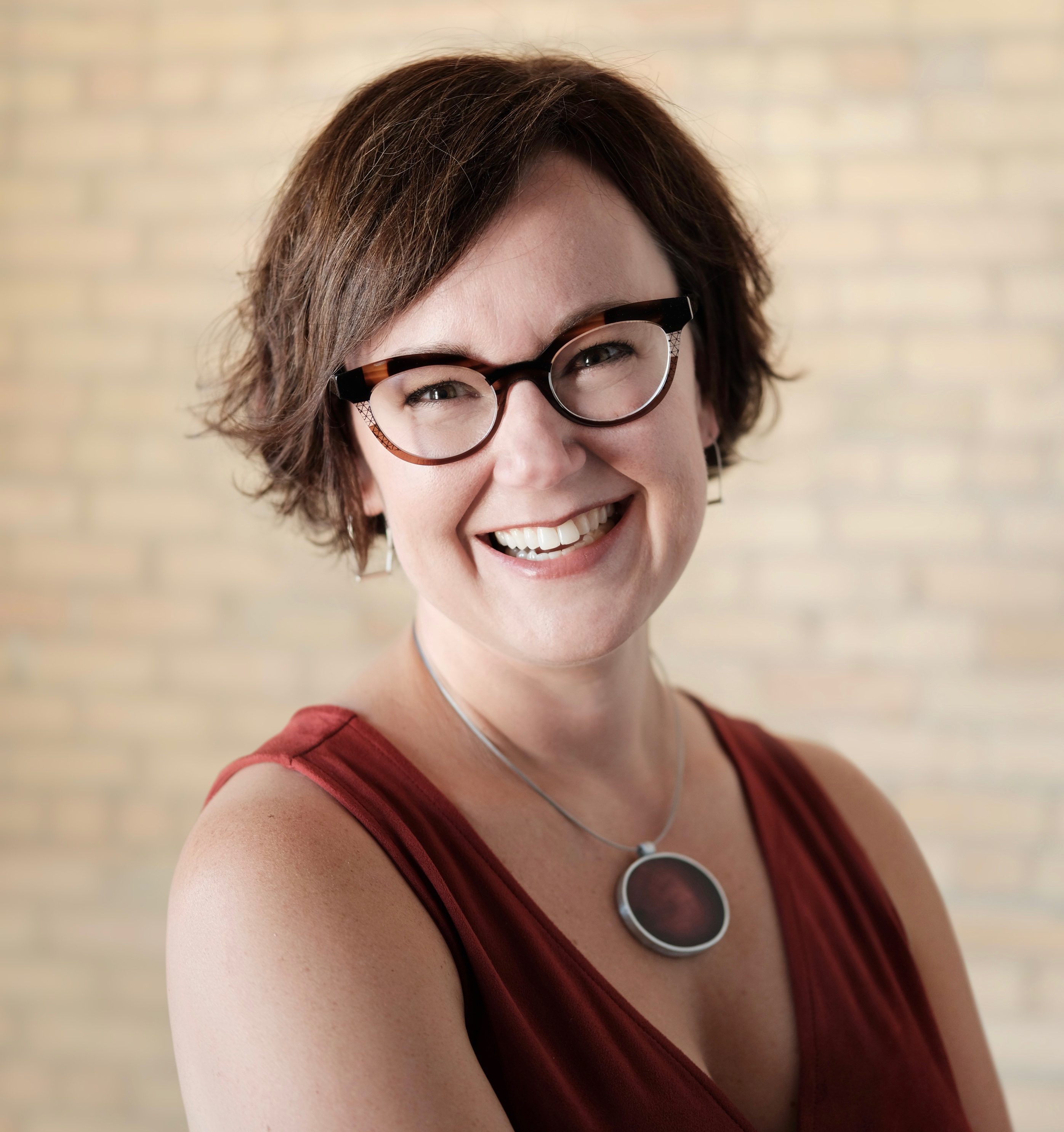
- Born: July 25, 1971 (age 55); Indiana
- Education: St. Olaf College
- Occupations: entrepreneur, author, podcaster
- Children: 2

Kristina Halvorson (born July 25, 1971) is an American writer, entrepreneur, speaker, podcaster, and expert on the subject of content strategy. She is the founder and CEO of Brain Traffic.

== Biography ==
In 1993, after graduating from St. Olaf College, Halvorson left her job working at a movie theatre to work as a freelance copywriter. Halvorson founded Brain Traffic, a content strategy consultancy, in 2001, which pivoted to content strategy as a service in 2007.

In 2009, Halvorson authored the first book on the topic of content strategy on the web, Content Strategy for the Web, and is credited as being the foundation of the industry. That same year, she initiated the first Content Strategy Consortium and was the keynote speaker at first Content Strategy Forum in Paris. In 2011, Halvorson launched Confab, a Minneapolis-based content strategy conference. She is the host of The Content Strategy Podcast. She has appeared as a featured speaker at conferences worldwide, including South by Southwest (SXSW).

Halvorson lives in St. Paul, Minnesota with her two children. She was active on Twitter but doesn't post much on socials anymore. She advocates for a healthy workplace.
