= Webmaster =

Person responsible for maintaining one or many websites

A webmaster is a person responsible for maintaining one or many websites. The title may refer to web architects, web developers, site authors, website administrators, website owners, website coordinators, or website publishers. The term is sometimes used in the tongue-in-cheek feminine form webmistress.

The duties of the webmaster may include ensuring that the web servers, hardware and software are operating accurately, designing the website, generating and revising web pages, replying to user comments, and examining traffic through the site. Webmasters "must also be well-versed in Web transaction software, payment-processing software, and security software." Webmasters may be generalists with HTML expertise who manage most or all aspects of Web operations. Depending on the nature of the websites they manage, webmasters typically know scripting languages such as JavaScript, PHP and Perl.

They may also be required to know how to configure web servers such as Apache or IIS and serve as the server administrator. An alternative definition of webmaster is a businessperson who uses online media to sell products and/or services. This broader definition covers not just the technical aspects of overseeing Web site construction and maintenance but also management of content, advertising, marketing, and order fulfillment for the Web site.

The term was first used in 1993, and has become increasingly archaic in professional contexts. In 2020, Google rebranded its "Google Webmasters Central" to "Google Search Central", having conducted a user experience study that found that very few web professionals chose to identify themselves as webmasters any more, with most preferring more specific titles such as web developer, blogger, online marketer, SEO provider, or site owner.

== History ==
The role of webmaster emerged in the early 1990s with the rapid growth of the World Wide Web. As organizations and individuals began establishing an online presence, there was an immediate need for skilled individuals who could manage both the technical infrastructure and content aspects of websites. Initially, webmasters were often responsible for all aspects of a website, functioning as jack-of-all-trades professionals who handled design, programming, content creation, and server administration. The term "webmaster" became widely recognized and standardized following the creation of the webmaster@domain email convention, which was established as a standard contact point for website-related inquiries and technical issues. This convention was formally documented in RFC 2142, published by the Internet Engineering Task Force (IETF) in May 1997. In the early days of the web, webmasters typically possessed a broad range of skills, as they often worked independently or in small teams with limited resources. They needed to understand HTML, basic graphic design, server administration, and network protocols, and often had to solve problems creatively with minimal documentation or community support. The role was particularly challenging as web standards were still evolving and cross-browser compatibility issues were common.

== Modern evolution ==
With the increasing complexity and specialization of web development since the late 1990s and early 2000s, the traditional role of webmaster has evolved significantly. In the early days, webmasters were responsible for all aspects of a website—from configuring and maintaining web servers, ensuring uptime, and handling software deployment, to updating content, managing database management systems, overseeing access rights, and coordinating domain name registration and DNS settings. As the web matured, responsibilities expanded to include security measures against threats such as SQL injection and DDoS attacks, performance optimization through CDNs and code optimization, SEO practices, analytics tracking, accessibility standards compliance, user support, and email system management.

Many organizations have moved away from having a single webmaster to employing specialized teams with clearly defined roles. Front-end developers now specialize in user interface implementation and client-side functionality, while back-end developers manage server-side logic, APIs, and databases. DevOps engineers handle continuous integration/continuous deployment, server infrastructure, and automation. Site reliability engineers (SRE) focus on maintaining high availability and performance at scale, while content managers and strategists oversee content strategy and publication workflows. SEO specialists optimize websites for search visibility, security specialists focus on cybersecurity and compliance, analytics specialists analyze user behavior and metrics, and Accessibility specialists ensure compliance with accessibility standards.

Despite this specialization trend, the term webmaster remains in use, particularly in smaller organizations, non-profit sectors, educational institutions, or for individuals who maintain personal websites or small business web presences. In larger enterprises, the equivalent role might be titled web manager, digital operations manager, web production manager, or digital platform administrator, reflecting the broader scope of responsibilities and oversight of specialized teams. However, industry professionals noted in 2006 that using webmaster as a job title may be counterproductive when recruiting, as it can attract less experienced candidates while deterring seasoned professionals who identify with more specialized titles.

The rise of cloud hosting services (such as AWS, Google Cloud Platform, and Microsoft Azure), sophisticated content management systems, website builders (like Wix, Squarespace, and Shopify), and SaaS platforms has fundamentally transformed the nature of the role. These tools have made some technical aspects more accessible to non-technical users while simultaneously introducing new challenges related to platform-specific knowledge, API integration, multi-platform management, and coordinating various web services and third-party tools. The emergence of headless CMS architectures, progressive web apps (PWAs), Jamstack development approaches, and serverless computing has further evolved the skillset required of modern webmasters, who must now understand not just traditional web hosting but also cloud-native architectures and modern deployment workflows.

== See also ==
- Web design
- Web developer
- Web designer
- Online producer
- Professional web designers
- Website governance
- Chief Web Officer
- Chief technology officer
- System administrator
- Content management system
- Search engine optimization
- Web hosting service
- Site reliability engineering
- DevOps
- Postmaster
- Web performance
- Web accessibility
- Information architecture
