= Federal Web Managers Council =

- Formation: 2004
- Purpose: Improve delivery of United States government's online information and services
- Region served: USA

The Federal Web Managers Council (Web Council) is an interagency group of senior federal government Web managers and new media directors who work together to improve the delivery of United States government information and services online. Established in 2004, its current mission is to provide opportunities for collaboration among U.S. government Web and new media professionals. It also recommends policies and guidelines for all U.S. federal public websites.

The Web Council serves as the steering committee for the much larger Web Content Managers Forum, a network of more than 2,000 government Web managers across the country. Among other activities, the Web Council organizes training events and conferences through Digital.gov (formerly DigitalGov University and Web Manager University), coordinates the work of its various Sub-Councils, and helps modernize federal policies to enhance the online delivery of government services and information.

Most recently the Web Council has been involved in the .gov reform effort. On December 16, 2011, the .gov Reform Task Force released the "State of the Federal Web Report", which highlights for the first time the size and scope of U.S. federal websites.

== History ==
The Web Council started as the Web Content Management Working Group. It was founded in January 2004 at the request of the Office of Management and Budget by the Interagency Committee on Government Information (ICGI). Its mission was to recommend policies and guidelines for all U.S. federal public websites, to comply with Sections 207(f)(1) and (2) of the E-Government Act of 2002 and with other requirements. In June 2004 the group issued its recommendations to the ICGI, and those became the foundation for the website WebContent.gov (now HowTo.gov). The Web Council now guides the work of several Sub-Councils and the Web Content Managers Forum, a community of more than 2,000 Web professionals from federal, state, local, territorial, and tribal U.S. government agencies. Members communicate and collaborate through a listserv.

== Mission and goals ==
The mission of the Web Council is to provide a venue for U.S. government Web and new media professionals to work together and share common challenges, ideas, and best practices. Its goal is to create citizen-focused and visitor-friendly government websites.

== Membership ==
Membership in the Web Council is limited to " senior level federal agency web or digital directors in the 24 Chief Financial Officers (CFO) Act agencies, and other select federal agencies that provide high-impact services to the public and federal agencies" Members work in various offices of their respective agencies, including Policy, Communications and Marketing, Public Affairs, and CIO.

== Structure ==
The Web Council is managed by two co-Chairs and is sponsored by the General Services Administration. Because members are located in offices across the country, most work is done through conference calls and online collaboration.

== Activities ==
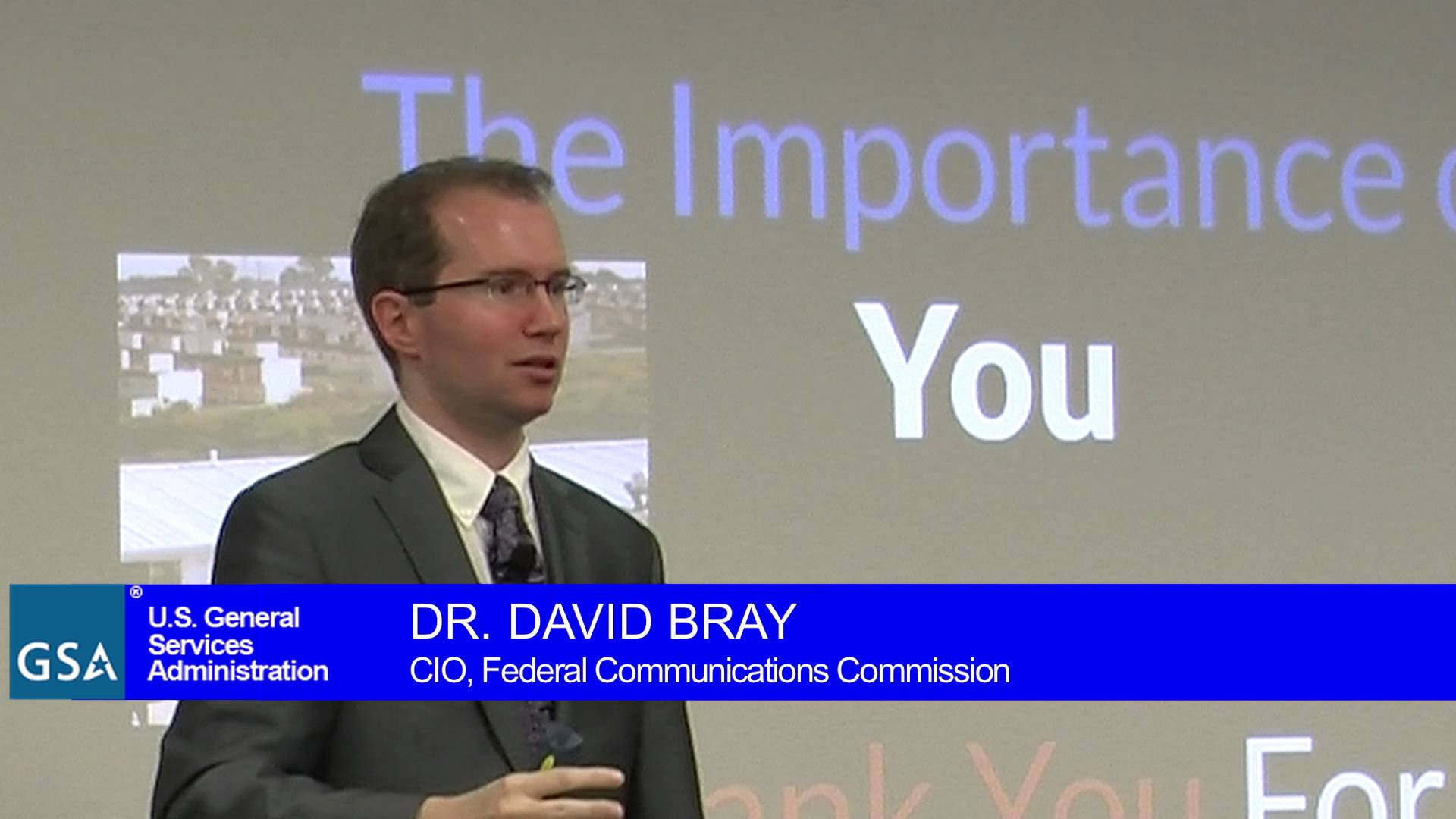
CIO Dr. David A. Bray speaking at 2014 DigitalGov Citizen Services Event. Keynote address on leadership in public service.

Among other activities, the Web Council:

- serves as the steering committee for the Web Content Managers Forum (the Forum), an ad hoc community of more than 2,000 federal, state, local, territorial, and tribal U.S. government Web and new media professionals who manage the content of government websites;
- manages the Forum listserv for community members to exchange ideas;
- organizes training events and conferences for government Web and new media professionals through Digital.gov (formerly DigitalGov University and Web Manager University);
- collaborates across government agencies to modernize policies and improve the federal government's ability to manage and deliver online information and services, including records management, Plain Writing initiatives, and the use of social media in government.

With GSA, the Web Council has co-sponsored the Government Web and New Media Conference, held annually, since 2004.

The Web Council has produced white papers in support of the Obama administration's Open Government Initiative. These include the 2008 report "Putting Citizens First: Transforming Online Government" and its follow-up report, "2010 Progress Report – Putting Citizens First: Transforming Online Government."

Most recently the Web Council has been involved in the .gov reform effort, part of President Obama's Campaign to Cut Waste by "identifying unnecessary websites that can be consolidated into other websites to reduce costs and improve the quality of service to the American public." On December 16, 2011, the .gov Reform Task Force released the "State of the Federal Web Report", which highlights for the first time the size and scope of U.S. federal websites, how agencies are managing them, and opportunities for improvement. The report contains data collected between August and October 2011, including a .gov Web Inventory, a Web Governance Survey, Web Improvement Plans, and a National Dialogue on Improving Federal Websites. Current federal CIO Steven VanRoekel noted that the report is an "opportunity" for federal agencies to "'get smart' about consolidation, sharing platforms and computing resources."
