= Rundfunkstaatsvertrag =

National broadcasting law of Germany

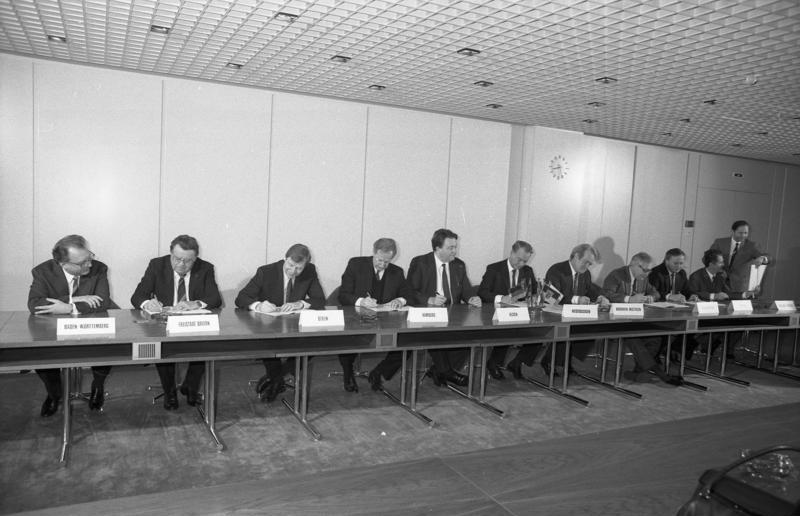
The minister-presidents of the Länder sign the Rundfunkstaatsvertrag on 3 April 1987.

The Rundfunkstaatsvertrag (English: Interstate Broadcasting Agreement), abbreviated as RStV, is the nationwide law for radio station and television licensing in the Federal Republic of Germany. Based on the Kulturhoheit der Länder (sovereignty of the German states in terms of cultural aspects) it is not a federal law but instead it is a treaty passed by all Bundesländer (states of Germany).

The full title of the law is Staatsvertrag für Rundfunk und Telemedien (English: State Treaty on Broadcasting Services and Telecommunication Media) but on most occasions it is called Rundfunkstaatsvertrag. The first version was enacted on 1 December 1987 (signed on 3 April 1987) and the fifteenth revision of 30 October 2010 was expected to come into effect on 1 January 2013.

The German Interstate Broadcasting Agreement is the basis for a series of other laws, most notably the Rundfunkgebührenstaatsvertrag (RGebStV – English: Interstate Agreement on Broadcasting Licence Fees) and the Rundfunkfinanzierungsstaatsvertrag (RFinStV – English: Interstate Agreement on the Financing of Broadcasting). Some aspects were refined by the federal Telemediengesetz (TMG – English: Telecommunication Media Act) that is otherwise covering Internet services.

The German public broadcasting services were introduced in post-war Germany in a similar fashion to the British Broadcasting Corporation. The Rundfunkstaatsvertrag is similar to the royal charter of the BBC however the licensing and financing model diverged over time. The Rundfunkstaatsvertrag was introduced in 1987 to allow licensing of private broadcast companies beyond the public broadcast services that existed before.

== See also ==
- Kultusministerkonferenz
