= Content strategy =

Content strategy guides the planning, development, and management of content. It is a recognized field in user experience design, and it also draws from adjacent disciplines such as information architecture, content management, business analysis, digital marketing, and technical communication.

== Definitions ==
Content strategy has been described as planning for "the creation, publication, and governance of useful, usable content." It has also been called "a repeatable system that defines the entire editorial content development process for a website development project."

In a 2007 article titled "Content Strategy: The Philosophy of Data," Rachel Lovinger describes the goal of content strategy as using "words and data to create unambiguous content that supports meaningful, interactive experiences." Here, she also provided the analogy that "content strategy is to copywriting as information architecture is to design." She encourages content strategists and collaborators to engage in early discussions about content meaning, models, and tools, to make sure strategy is integrated from the start rather than as an afterthought.

The Content Strategy Alliance combines Kevin Nichols' definition with Kristina Halvorson's and defines content strategy as "getting the right content to the right user at the right time through strategic planning of content creation, delivery, and governance."

Content strategy involves more than creating content for a website or other digital platform. It also considers how information is organised, maintained, and used to support an organisation’s goals. This means that content planning can involve different departments, including marketing, communication, and technical teams. A successful content strategy therefore needs to consider both the needs of the audience and the processes an organisation uses to manage its information.

== Practitioners ==
Content strategists are often familiar with a wide range of approaches, techniques, and tools. The perspectives that content strategists bring also depend heavily on their professional training and education. For instance, some specialize in "front-end strategy," which includes developing personas, journey mapping the user experience, aligning business strategy and user needs, developing a brand strategy, exploring different channels, and creating style guidelines and search engine optimization (SEO) guidelines. Others specialize in "back-end strategy," which includes creating content models, planning taxonomies and metadata, structuring content management systems, and building systems to support content reuse. Both roles involve addressing workflow and governance issues.

Many organizations and individuals tend to confuse content strategists with editors. However, content strategy is "about more than just the written word," according to Washington State University associate professor Brett Atwood. For example, Atwood indicates that a practitioner needs to also "consider how content might be re-distributed and/or re-purposed in other channels of delivery."

It has also been proposed that the content strategist performs the role of a curator. Just as a museum curator sifts through a collection of content and identifies key pieces that can be juxtaposed against each other to create meaning and spur excitement, a content strategist "must approach a business’s content as a medium that needs to be strategically selected and placed to engage the audience, convey a message, and inspire action."
