= Web strategy =

A web strategy is a long-term strategic business plan indicating how to create and develop a company's online presence adhering to the business development strategy.

== Description ==
Depending on the business maturity, immediate needs, and long-term goals, the programme should yield different results. e.g. if the business is only starting to tap into the online space, then the web strategy programme will outline how the business should position itself online, what online media it should use to spread its message, how it should communicate with the customers, what services and products it should provide online, and what supporting infrastructure for the online operation should be in place.

A web strategy is created by a highly skilled business professional, the web strategist, who is knowledgeable in online trends, business, design, user experience and technology concepts and principles.

== Impact of social media ==
Once a web strategy is in place, one way of launching the website immediately onto the Internet is through social media. Facebook, Twitter, Instagram and other social media applications have become indispensable tools for business, as companies and their employees regularly engage directly with the public (that is, customers, potential customers and even competitors), actively ‘sharing’ information across various social media platforms.

Social media enables two-way communication and collaboration. Organisations can utilised it to great success building a competitive advantage, generating business and engaging with their customers on a more personal level. Brand awareness social media posts are like virtual flyers or the online equivalent of newspaper ads. They build name recognition and help your small business start to form a brand identity.

=== Advantages ===
- A way for businesses to broaden their exposure to the public at a much lower cost than traditional marketing
- Pay-per-click advertisements are geotargeted according to specific criteria, to reach the correct audience.
- Establishing a presence on widely used platforms can help target new customers and make the brand more visible
- Two-way communication facilitated by social media can improve customer service
- Enables businesses to gain new information about their customers
- Higher conversion rates. Social media is a place where brands can act like people do, and this is important because people like doing business with other people; not with companies.

=== Disadvantages ===
- Followers are free to post their comments on these platforms, exposing the business to the possibility of negative publicity
- Hackers pose a threat to businesses on social media, i.e. false information can quickly go viral
- Updating the social media accounts takes time and effort
- Need to commit resources to managing your social media presence, responding to feedback and producing new content
- It can be difficult to quantify the return on investment and the value of one channel over another

== See also ==
- Strategic planning
- Strategy
- Web development
- Web application development
- Virtual business
- Google Analytics
