= Headless content management system =

Content management system without a front end

A headless content management system, or headless CMS, is a back end-only web content management system that acts primarily as a content repository. A headless CMS makes content accessible via an API for display on any device, without a built-in front end or presentation layer.

Whereas a traditional CMS typically combines a website's content and presentation layers, a headless CMS comprises the content component and focuses on the administrative interface for content creators, the facilitation of content workflows and collaboration, and the organization of content into taxonomies.

Cloud-first headless CMS's are those that were also built with a multi-tenant cloud model at their core and whose vendors promote software as a service (SaaS). These vendors promise high availability, scalability, and full management of security, upgrades, and hotfixes on behalf of clients. Headless commerce uses the same setup to separate back-end product management and navigation from the front end of a website or other display types (e.g., IoT). This is similar to how headless CMS's focus on creating content in the back end to be displayed on front ends via APIs.

== Coupled CMS vs. headless CMS ==
Most monolithic content management systems are "coupled", meaning that the content management application (CMA) and the content delivery application (CDA) come together in a single application. This makes back-end user tools, content editing and taxonomy, website design, and templates inseparable.

== Decoupled CMS ==
A decoupled CMS and a headless CMS have a lot in common as a headless CMS is a type of decoupled architecture.

The decoupled architecture allows for easier scalability and provides better security than coupled architecture, but it does not provide the same support for omnichannel delivery. There are multiple environments to manage, hiking up infrastructure and maintenance costs.

The headless approach has also been applied to enterprise software outside of content management. Example of this include Salesforce, who introduced Headless 360 following their acquisition of Contentful, decoupling its CRM platform from its proprietary interface and making the underlying data accessible via API to external tools and AI.

== Market adoption ==
Adoption of headless content management systems has increased among organizations and individual developers as API-first and composable software architectures have become more widespread. Market research has attributed this growth to rising demand for omnichannel digital experiences, increased reliance on APIs for content delivery and system integration, and the need for scalable and flexible alternatives to traditional monolithic CMS platforms.

According to Grand View Research, the global headless content management system software market was valued at US$1.8 billion in 2025 and is projected to reach US$6.2 billion by 2033, representing a compound annual growth rate (CAGR) of 17.5% from 2026 to 2033. The report identified North America as the largest regional market in 2025, accounting for 36.9% of global revenue.

== Products ==
Headless content management systems are available as both commercial and open-source software. Most platforms provide web-based interfaces for creating and managing structured content while exposing that content through APIs (typically REST, GraphQL, or both) for delivery to websites, mobile applications, and other digital channels.

Examples of dedicated headless CMS platforms include Contentful, Sanity, Strapi, Hygraph, and Storyblok, among others. These platforms differ in their deployment models, supported APIs, extensibility, and approaches to content modeling, but generally separate content management from presentation, allowing developers to use a variety of frontend frameworks and delivery platforms.

Some website builders and digital experience platforms also offer headless capabilities alongside traditional coupled content management. Platforms such as Wix, Optimizely, Webflow, and Adobe have introduced APIs or headless content features that enable content to be delivered independently of their built-in website rendering tools. These offerings are often described as hybrid or decoupled CMS platforms because they support both conventional website authoring and API-based content delivery.

== Criticisms and disadvantages ==
Headless CMS is a content management system (CMS) without a pre-built front-end presentation layer or templating system; instead, it provides a content repository and an API for managing the content. While this allows for greater flexibility and customizability, it can also present challenges or drawbacks for teams and organizations. The main downside is that it may require more effort to set up and configure and a certain level of web development knowledge on both the front and back end.

- They require heavier technical proficiency than their monolithic counterparts.
