= Web content management system =

Content management system specifically for web content

A web content management system (WCM or WCMS) is a software content management system (CMS) specifically for web content. It provides website authoring, collaboration, and administration tools that help users with little knowledge of web programming languages or markup languages create and manage website content. A WCMS provides the foundation for collaboration, providing users the ability to manage documents and output for multiple author editing and participation. Most systems use a content repository or a database to store page content, metadata, and other information assets the system needs.

A presentation layer (template engine) displays the content to website visitors based on a set of templates, which are sometimes XSLT files.

Most systems use server side caching to improve performance. This works best when the WCMS is not changed often but visits happen frequently. Administration is also typically done through browser-based interfaces, but some systems require the use of a fat client.

== Capabilities ==
A web content management system controls a dynamic collection of web material, including HTML documents, images, and other forms of media. A WCMS facilitates document control, auditing, editing, and timeline management. A WCMS typically has the following features:

Automated templates
Create standard templates (usually HTML and XML) that users can apply to new and existing content, changing the appearance of all content from one central place.
Access control
Some WCMS systems support user groups, which control how registered users interact with the site. A page on the site can be restricted to one or more groups. This means an anonymous user (someone not logged-on), or a logged on user who is not a member of the group a page is restricted to, is denied access.
Scalable expansion
Available in most modern WCMSs.is the ability to expand a single implementation (one installation on one server) across multiple domains, depending on the server's settings. WCMS sites may be able to create microsites/web portals within a main site as well.
Easily editable content
Once content is separated from the visual presentation of a site, it usually becomes much easier and quicker to edit and manipulate. Most WCMS software includes WYSIWYG editing tools allowing non-technical users to create and edit content.
Scalable feature sets
Most WCMS software includes plug-ins or modules that can be easily installed to extend an existing site's functionality.
Web standards upgrades
Active WCMS software usually receives regular updates that include new feature sets and keep the system up to current web standards.
Workflow management
Workflow management is the process of creating cycles of sequential and parallel tasks that must be accomplished in the WCMS. For example, one or many content creators can submit a story, but it is not published until the copy editor cleans it up and the editor-in-chief approves it.
Collaboration
WCMS software may act as a collaboration platform where many users retrieve and work on content. Changes can be tracked and authorized for publication or ignored reverting to old versions. Other advanced forms of collaboration allow multiple users to modify (or comment) a page at the same time in a collaboration session.
Delegation
Some WCMS software allows for various user groups to have limited privileges over specific content on the website, spreading out the responsibility of content management.
Document management
WCMS software may provide a means of collaboratively managing the lifecycle of a document from initial creation time, through revisions, publication, archive, and document destruction.
Content virtualization
WCMS software may provide a means of allowing each user to work within a virtual copy of the entire website, document set, and/or code base. This enables viewing changes to multiple interdependent resources in context before submission.
Content syndication
WCMS software often helps distribute content by generating RSS and Atom data feeds to other systems. They may also e-mail users when updates become available.
Multilingual communication
Many WCMSs can display content in multiple languages.
Versioning
Like document management systems, WCMS software may implement version control, by which users check pages in and out of the WCMS. Authorized editors can retrieve previous versions and work from a selected point. Versioning is useful for content that changes and requires updating, but it may be necessary to start from or reference a previous version.

== Types ==
A WCMS can use one of three approaches: offline processing, online processing, and hybrid processing. These terms describe the deployment pattern for the WCMS in terms of when it applies presentation templates to render web pages from structured content.

=== Offline processing ===
These systems, sometimes referred to as "static site generators", pre-process all content, applying templates before publication to generate web pages. Since pre-processing systems do not require a server to apply the templates at request time, they may also exist purely as design-time tools.

=== Online processing ===
These systems apply templates on-demand. They may generate HTML when a user visits the page, or the user might receive pre-generated HTML from a web cache. Most open source WCMSs support add-ons that extended the system's capabilities. These include features like forums, blogs, wikis, web stores, photo galleries, and contact management. These are variously called modules, nodes, widgets, add-ons, or extensions.

=== Hybrid processing ===
Some systems combine the offline and online approaches. Some systems write out executable code (e.g., JSP, ASP, PHP, ColdFusion, or Perl pages) rather than just static HTML. That way, personnel don't have to deploy the WCMS itself on every web server. Other hybrids operate in either an online or offline mode.

== Advantages ==
Low cost
Some content management systems are free, such as Drupal, eZ Publish, TYPO3, Joomla, Zesty.io, and WordPress. Others may be affordable based on size subscriptions. Although subscriptions can be expensive, overall the cost of not having to hire full-time developers can lower the total costs. Additionally software can be bought based on need for many WCMSs.

Ease of customization
A universal layout is created, making pages have a similar theme and design without much code. Many WCMS tools use a drag and drop AJAX system for their design modes. It makes it easy for beginner users to create custom front-ends.

Ease of use
WCMSs accommodate non-technical people. Simplicity in design of the admin UI lets website content managers and other users update content without much training in coding or system maintenance.

Workflow management
WCMSs provide the facility to control how content is published, when it is published, and who publishes it. Some WCMSs allow administrators to set up rules for workflow management, guiding content managers through a series of steps required for each of their tasks.

Search engine optimization
WCMS websites also accommodate search engine optimization (SEO). Content freshness helps, as some search engines prefer websites with newer content. Social media plugins help build a community around content. RSS feeds automatically generated by blogs, or WCMS websites can increase the number of subscribers and readers to a site. URL rewriting can be implemented easily—clean URLs without parameters further help in SEO.Some plugins specifically help with website SEO.

== Disadvantages ==
Cost of implementations
Larger scale implementations may require training, planning, and certifications. Certain WCMSs may require hardware installation. Commitment to the software is required on bigger investments. Commitment to training, developing, and upkeep are costs incurred in any enterprise system.

Cost of maintenance
Maintaining WCMSs may require license updates, upgrades, and hardware maintenance.

Latency issues
Larger WCMSs can experience latency if hardware infrastructure is not up-to-date, databases are used incorrectly, or web cache files that reload every time data updates grow too large. Load balancing issues may also impair caching files.

Tool mixing
Because the URLs of many WCMSs are dynamically generated with internal parameters and reference information, they are often not stable enough for static pages and other web tools, particularly search engines, to rely on them.

Security
WCMS's are often forgotten about when hardware, software, and operating systems are patched for security threats. Due to lack of patching by the user, a hacker can use unpatched WCMS software to exploit vulnerabilities to enter an otherwise secure environment. WCMS's should be part of an overall, holistic security patch management program to maintain the highest possible security standards.

== See also ==
- Content management
- Content management system
- Dynamic web page
- Enterprise content management
- Headless content management system
- HTML
- LAMP (software bundle)
- List of content management systems
- Web portal
- Website builder
- Web content development
- Wiki
