= Benevolent dictator for life =

Title given to a small number of open-source software development leaders

Benevolent dictator for life (BDFL) or just benevolent dictator is a tongue-in-cheek title given to a small number of free and open-source software development leaders, typically project founders who retain the final say in disputes or arguments within the community.

== History ==
The term benevolent dictator has been around since at least 1868 and its usage in computer contexts dates back to the early beginnings as can be seen in a Usenet post from 1984 where it has been used for a moderator.

Benevolent dictator for life is thought to have been first used in 1995 for Guido van Rossum, the creator of the Python programming language. Shortly after Van Rossum joined the Corporation for National Research Initiatives, the term appeared in a follow-up mail by Ken Manheimer to a meeting trying to create a semi-formal group that would oversee Python development and workshops; this initial use included an additional joke of naming Van Rossum the "First Interim BDFL". The title was initially coined as "Benevolent Dictator" by Ken Manheimer; later Barry Warsaw suggested it would be "Benevolent Dictator for Life".

Eric S. Raymond's essay "Homesteading the Noosphere" (1999) also popularized the term benevolent dictator for a single decision-making open source owner or maintainer. Raymond elaborates on how the nature of open source forces the "dictatorship" to keep itself benevolent, since a strong disagreement can lead to the forking of the project under the rule of new leaders. Most open source software development projects utilize distributed version control systems, in which contributors submit pull requests to the project's maintainer, who may merge or reject the submission. Other distributed copies of the software are then based on that maintainer's repo. The position of BDFL is a consequence of network effect. They become stewards of the overall project on account of being the repo that the rest of the community is subscribed to and submits changes to.

In July 2018, van Rossum announced that he would be stepping down as BDFL of Python without appointing a successor, effectively eliminating the title within the Python community structure. In 2025, Mastodon developer Eugen Rochko stepped down, transferring ownership to a non-profit structure.

== Referent candidates ==
Key
†	Deceased

Name	Project	Type	Ref.
Sylvain Benner	Spacemacs	Community-driven Emacs distribution	
Vitalik Buterin	Ethereum	Blockchain-based cryptocurrency	
Dries Buytaert	Drupal	Content management framework	
François Chollet	Keras	Deep learning framework	
Evan Czaplicki	Elm	Front-end web programming language	
Laurent Destailleur	Dolibarr ERP CRM	Software suite for enterprise resource planning and customer relationship management	
David Heinemeier Hansson	Ruby on Rails	Web framework	
Rich Hickey	Clojure	Programming language	
Adrian Holovaty and Jacob Kaplan-Moss	Django	Web framework	
Andrew Kelley	Zig	Programming language	
Xavier Leroy	OCaml	Programming language	
Haoyuan Li	Alluxio	Data Orchestration System	
Miles Lubin	JuMP	Mathematical optimization modeling language in Julia	
Yukihiro Matsumoto (Matz)	Ruby	Programming language	
Wes McKinney	Pandas	Python data analysis library	
Gavin Mendel-Gleason (Note: CTO of TerminusDB)	TerminusDB	Open-source graph database for knowledge graph representation	
Bram Moolenaar†	Vim	Text editor	
Matt Mullenweg (Note: Lead Developer at the WordPress Foundation)	WordPress	Content management framework	
Martin Odersky	Scala	Programming language	
Taylor Otwell	Laravel	Web framework	
Theo de Raadt	OpenBSD	A Unix-like operating system	
Arnold Robbins	Awk, Gawk	Programming language	
Ton Roosendaal (Note: Chairman of the Blender Foundation)	Blender	3D computer graphics software	
Sébastien Ros	Orchard Project	Content management system	
Mark Shuttleworth (Note: CEO of Canonical Ltd. until December 2009, again since July 2017)	Ubuntu	Linux distribution	
Jeremy Soller	Redox	Operating system	
Don Syme (Note: Technical Advisor at the F# Software Foundation)	F#	Programming language	
Linus Torvalds (Note: Sponsee of the Linux Foundation. Also holds the trademark for Linux.)	Linux	Operating system kernel	
José Valim	Elixir	Programming language	
Pauli Virtanen	SciPy	Python library used for scientific and technical computing	
Patrick Volkerding	Slackware	Linux distribution	
Nathan Voxland	Liquibase	Database schema management	
Jimmy Wales	Wikimedia Foundation	Collaborative knowledge project	(Note: Disputed by Wales; "I am not the benevolent dictator of anything")
Jeremy Walker	Exercism	Open-source programming education platform	
Shaun Walker	DotNetNuke	Web application framework	
Larry Wall	Perl	Programming language	
Evan You	Vue.js	JavaScript MVVM framework for building user interfaces and single-page applications.	
Soumith Chintala	PyTorch	Deep learning framework	
Martin Traverso, Dain Sundstrom, David Phillips	Trino	SQL query engine	
Kohsuke Kawaguchi	Jenkins	Automation server	
Gabor de Mooij	RedBeanPHP	Database object relational mapper	
Bram Cohen	BitTorrent	Peer-to-peer file sharing protocol	
Walter Bright	D (programming language)	Programming language	
Ritchie Vink	Polars	Data analysis framework	
William Falcon	PyTorch Lightning	Deep learning framework	
Lars Hvam	abapGit	Git client for ABAP	
Sebastián Ramírez	FastAPI	Web framework for building APIs with Python	
Bill Hall (gingerBill)	Odin	Programming language	
Damien Elmes (dae)	Anki	Spaced repetition system	
Ryan Cramer	ProcessWire	Free content management system (CMS) and framework (CMF)	
Salvatore Sanfilippo	Redis	In memory key-value database	
Daniel Stenberg	cURL	Web protocol client	
Werner Schweer	MuseScore Studio	Music notation software	
Paulus Schoutsen	Home Assistant	Home automation platform	

== See also ==
- Design by dictator
