= List of filename extensions (A–E) =

This alphabetical list of filename extensions contains extensions of notable file formats used by multiple notable applications or services.

== A ==
Ext.	Description	Used by
A	Archive file	ar (Unix)
AA	Advanced Audio file	YouTube Music
AAC	Advanced Audio Coding file	iOS, Nintendo DSi, Nintendo 3DS, YouTube Music
ACCDB	Microsoft Access Database	Microsoft Access Database (Open XML)
ACCFT	Microsoft Access Data Type Template	Microsoft Access
ACO	Adobe color palette format (.aco)	Adobe Photoshop
ADB	JET-based backup repository files	Veeam Backup for Microsoft 365
ADT	Abrechnungsdatentransfer, an xDT application	Healthcare providers in Germany
ADX	Document	Archetype Designer
ADZ	Amiga Disk Zipped (See Amiga Disk File)	GZip
AGDA	Agda (programming language) source file	Agda typechecker/compiler
AGR	ArcView ASCII grid	
AHK	AutoHotkey script file	AutoHotkey
AI	Adobe Illustrator Artwork	Adobe Illustrator
AIFF	Audio Interchange File Format	professional audio processing applications and on Macintosh
AIFC	Compressed Audio Interchange File Format	
AIO	APL programming language file transfer format file	
AMF	Additive Manufacturing File Format	Computer Aided Design Software
AMG	System image file	ACTOR
AML	AutomationML	AutomationML Group
AMLX	Compressed and packed AutomationML file	AutomationML Group
AMPL	AMPL source code file	AMPL
AMR	Adaptive Multi-Rate audio	
AMV	Actions Media Video	
AMOGUS	Plain-text file that defines settings	Among Us
ANI	Animation cursors for Win	Win95 - WinNT
ANN	Annotations of old Windows Help file	Windows 3.0 - XP
APE	Monkey's Audio (Lossless)	audio media players
APK	Android application package	Android
APK	Alpine Linux Package	Alpine Linux and derivatives
ARC	ARC (file format)	
ART	Gerber format	Cadence Allegro, EAGLE
ARW	Sony Alpha RAW image format	Sony
ASAX	ASP.NET global application file	
ASCX	ASP.NET User Control	
ASF	Advanced Streaming Format (Compressed Windows audio/video)	Microsoft Corporation
ASHX	ASP.NET handler file	
ASM	Assembler language source	TASM, MASM, NASM, FASM
ASPX	Active server page extended file	Microsoft Corporation
ASX	Advanced Stream Redirector file, redirects to an ASF file (see ASF)	Microsoft Corporation
ATG	Coco/R LL(1) formal grammar	Coco/R
AT3	Atrac 3 Sound/music file	All Sony devices and programs with the Atrac 3+ specification
AU	audio file	
AVI	Audio Video Interleave	Video for Windows
AVIF	AV1 Image File Format	
AWK	AWK script/program	awk, GNU Awk, mawk, nawk, MKS AWK, Awka (compiler)
AX	DirectShow Filter	Microsoft Corporation (Video Players)
AXF	lightweight geodatabase	ESRI ArcPad

== B ==
Ext.	Description	Used by
B	BASIC language source	BASIC
B	bc arbitrary precision calculator language file	Unix bc tool
B64	base64 binary-to-text encoding	
BAK	backup	various
BANK	FMOD asset file	FMOD
BAR	Broker Archive. Compressed file containing number of other files for deployment.	IBM App Connect
BAS	BASIC language source	QuickBASIC - GW-BASIC - FreeBASIC - others
BAT	Batch file	MS-DOS, RT-11, DOS-based command processors
BDF	Glyph Bitmap Distribution Format, a format used to store bitmap fonts.	Adobe
BDT	Behandlungsdatentransfer, an xDT application	Healthcare providers in Germany
BEAM	Executable bytecode file in fat binary format	BEAM (Erlang virtual machine)
BIB	Bibliography database	BibTeX
BIN	binary file	Every OS
BLEND	Blender project file	Blender
BM3	UIQ3 Phone backup	
BMP	OS/2 or Win graphics format (BitMap Picture)	QPeg - CorelDraw - PC Paintbrush - many
BPS	WPS backup file	Microsoft Word, Microsoft Works
BR7	Bryce 7 project file	Bryce 7
BSK	Bryce 7 sky presets file	Bryce 7
BSON	JSON-like binary serialization	MongoDB
BSP	Binary space partitioning tree file	Quake-based game engines
BYU	3D geometry format	CAD systems
BZ2	Archive	bzip2

== C ==
Ext.	Description	Used by
C--	C-- language source	Sphinx C--
C	C language source Note that on case-sensitive platforms like Unix and with the gcc compiler the uppercase .C extension indicates a C++ source file.	Watcom C/C++, Borland C/C++, gcc and other C compilers
C	Unix file archive	COMPACT
C++	C++ language source	
CPP	C++ language source	
C32	COMBOOT Executable (32-bit)	SYSLINUX
CAB	Cabinet archive	Windows 95 and later, many file archivers
CACHE	Used by various softwares to speed up loading of already-used data, they are generally safe to delete.	Various Softwares
CBL	COBOL language source	
CBT	COMBOOT Executable (incompatible with DOS COM files)	SYSLINUX
CC	C++ language source	
CD	ASP.NET class diagram file	
CDF	Common Data Format	
CDF	Computable Document Format	Mathematica
CDP	Trainz Railroad Simulator Content Dispatcher Pack	Trainz Railroad Simulator
CDR	Vector graphics format (drawinF	CorelDraw
CDXML	MIME type: chemical/x-cdxmlXML version of the ChemDraw Exchange format, CDX.	
CER	Security certificate	Microsoft Windows
CFG	Plain-text configuration file used to store settings, presets, and commands.	Source Engine Games, Microsoft Flight Simulator, and M.U.G.E.N Game Engine
CGM	Computer Graphics Metafile vector graphics	A&L - HG - many
CHM	Compiled Help File	Microsoft Windows, Help Explorer Viewer
CHO	ChordPro lead sheet (lyrics and chords)	ChordPro and similar tools
CIA	Decrypted Nintendo 3DS ROM cartridge	Nintendo 3DS
CIF	Crystallographic Information File	RasMol, Jmol
CLASS	Java class file	Java
CLS	ooRexx class file	ooRexx
CMD	Command Prompt batch file	Microsoft Windows NT based operating systems
CMD	Executable programs	CP/M-86 operating system
CML	Chemical Markup Language, for interchange of chemical information.	
CMOD	Celestia Model	Celestia
CN1	CNR IDL	MITRE
CNOFF	3D object file format with normals (.noff, .cnoff) NOFF is an acronym derived from Object File Format. Occasionally called CNOFF if color information is present.	
COB	COBOL language source	GnuCOBOL
COE	Coefficient file	Xilinx ISE
COFF	3D object file format (.off, .coff) OFF is an acronym for Object File Format. Used for storing and exchanging 3D models. Occasionally called COFF if color information is present.	
COL	DIMACS graph data format.	
COM	DOS program	DOS-
COMPILE	ASP.NET precompiled stub file	
CONFIG	Configuration file	
CPC	Compressed image	Cartesian Perceptual Compression
CPIO	cpio archive file	cpio
CPL	Control panel file	Windows 3.x
CPY	COBOL source copybook file	
CR2	Raw image format	Canon digital cameras
CR3	Raw image format	Canon R series cameras
CRAI	CRAM index	
CRAFT	Holds Spacecraft Assembly information	Kerbal Space Program
CRT	Security certificate	Microsoft Windows
CS	C# language source	
CSPROJ	C# project file	Microsoft Visual Studio
CSS	Cascading style sheet	
CSO	Compiled Shader Object, extension of compiled HLSL	High-Level Shading Language
CSV	Comma Separated Values text file format (ASCII)	
CTG	Canon Digital Camera Catalog	
CUB	Used by electronic structure programs to store orbital or density values on a three-dimensional grid.	
CUBE	same as .cub	
CUR	Non-animated cursor (extended from ICO)	Windows
CXX	C++ language source	

== D ==
Ext.	Description	Used by
D	D Programming Language source file	DMD
D	Directory containing configuration files (informal standard)	Unix
DAA	Direct Access Archive	
DAE	COLLADA file	
DAF	Data file	Digital Anchor
DPFHTML	Extended from HTML	DarkPurpleOF's Website Extension
DPFSTICKERS	JSON Sticker Pack File	DarkPurpleOF's Website Importable
DART	Dart source file	Dart
DAT	AMPL data file	AMPL
DAT	LDraw (Sub)Part File, 3D Model	LDraw
DAT	Data	RSNetWorx Project
DAT	Data file in special format or ASCII	
DAT	Database file	Clarion (programming language)
DAT	Norton Utilities disc image data. It saves Boot sector, part of FAT and root directory in image.DAT on same drive.	Norton Utilities
DAT	Optical disc image (can be ISO9660, but not restricted to)	cdrdao, burnatonce
DAT	Video CD MPEG stream	
DAT	Windows registry hive (REG.DAT Windows 3.11; USER.DAT and SYSTEM.DAT Windows 95, 98, and ME; NTUSER.DAT Windows NT/2000/XP/7)	Microsoft Windows
DATS	Dynamic source	ATS
DB	Database file	DB Browser for SQLite
DBA	DarkBasic source code	
DBC	Database Connection configuration file	AbInitio
DBF	Native format of the dBASE database management application.	
DBG	Debugger script	DOS debug - Watcom debugger
DBG	Symbolic debugging information	Microsoft C/C++
DEB	deb software package	Debian Linux and derivatives
DEM	digital elevation model (DEM) including GTOPO30 and USGSDEM. GTOPO30 is a distribution format for a global digital elevation model (DEM) with 30-arc-second grid spacing. USGSDEM is the standard format for the distribution of terrain elevation data for the United States.	
DEM	Recorded gameplay demo file that lets you replay matches from another person's POV	Source Engine Games
DGN	CAD Drawing	Bentley Systems, MicroStation and Intergraph's Interactive Graphics Design System (IGDS) CAD programs
DICOM	Digital Imaging and Communications in Medicine (DICOM) bitmap	DICOM Software (XnView)
DIF	Data Interchange Format	Visicalc
DIF	Output from [diff] command - script for Patch command	
DIRED	Directory listing (ls format)	Dired
DIVX	DivX media format	
DLL	Dynamic-link library is a shared library.	Microsoft Windows or OS/2 operating system.
DMG	Apple Disk Image	macOS (Disk Utility)
DMP	memory dump file (e.g. screen or memory)	
DN	Dimension model format	Adobe Dimension
DNG	Digital Negative, a-publicly available archival format for the raw files generated by digital cameras	At least 30 camera models from at least 10 manufacturers, and at least 200 software products
DO	Redo recipes; usually written in sh, but may be written in a different language with a shebang.	Redo
DOC	A Document, or an ASCII text file with text formatting codes in with the text; used by many word processors	Microsoft Word and others
DOCM	Microsoft Word Macro-Enabled Document	Microsoft Word
DOCX	Microsoft Word Document	Microsoft Word
DOT	Microsoft Word document template	Microsoft Word
DOTX	Office Open XML Text document template	Microsoft Word
DPX	Digital Picture Exchange	
DRC	Dirac format video	
DSC	Celestia Deep Space Catalog file	Celestia
DTA	Stata database transport format.	Stata
DTD	Document Type Definition	
DVC	Data version control yaml pointer into blob storage	
DWF	Autodesk Design Web Format	Design Review
DWG	Drawing	AutoCAD, IntelliCAD, PowerCAD, Drafix, DraftSight etc.
DX	same as JDX and JCM.	
DXF	Drawing Interchange File Format vector graphics	AutoCAD, IntelliCAD, PowerCAD, etc.

== E ==
Ext.	Description	Used by
E	E language source code	E
E##	EnCase Evidence File chunk	EnCase Forensic Analysis Suite entity
E00	ArcInfo interchange file	GIS software
E2D	2-dimensional vector graphics file	Editor included in JFire
e57	A file format developed by ASTM International for storing point clouds and images	Most software that enables viewing and/or editing of 3D point clouds
EBD	versions of DOS system files (AUTOEXEC.BAT, COMMAND.COM, CONFIG.SYS, WINBOOT.SYS, etc.) for an emergency boot disk	Windows 98, ME
EC	Source code	eC
ECC	Error-checking file	dvdisaster
EDB	Microsoft Exchange database using Microsoft Extensible Storage Engine (ESE/JET Blue) database architecture	Microsoft Exchange Server
EDE	Ensoniq EPS disk image	AWAVE
EDF	European data format	Medical timeseries storage files
EFI	Extensible Firmware Interface	
EIS	EIS Spectrum Analyser Project	EIS Spectrum Analyser
EL	Emacs Lisp source code file	Emacs
ELC	Byte-compiled Emacs Lisp code	Emacs
ELF	Executable and Linkable File EurekaLog File (contains details of an exception)	Unix EurekaLog (https://www.eurekalog.com/)
EMAIL	Outlook Express Email Message	Windows Live Mail, Outlook Express, Microsoft Notepad
EMAKER	E language source code (maker)	E
EMF	Microsoft Enhanced Metafile	
EML	Email conforming to RFC 5322; Stationery Template	Email clients;Outlook Express
EMZ	Microsoft Enhanced Metafile compressed with ZIP	Microsoft Office suite
EOT	Embedded OpenType	
EP	GUI wireframe/prototype project	Prikhi Pencil, Evolus Pencil
EPA	Award BIOS splash screen	Award BIOS, XnView
EPS	Encapsulated PostScript	CorelDraw - PhotoStyler - PMView - Adobe Illustrator - Ventua Publisher
EPUB	Electronic Publication (e-Reader format)	Okular (Linux) - Apple Books - Sony Reader - Adobe Digital Editions - Calibre (LMW)
EU4	Europa Universalis 4 save game file	Europa Universalis 4
ERL	Erlang source code file	
ES6	ECMAScript 6 file	
ESCPCB	Data file of "esCAD pcb", PCB Pattern Layout Design Software	esCAD pcb provided by Electro-System
ESCSCH	Data file of "esCAD sch", Drawing Schematics Diagram Software	esCAD sch provided by Electro-System
ESD	Windows Imaging Format	ImageX, DISM, 7-Zip, wimlib
ESF	Electronic Theater Controls, Inc. theatrical lighting show control file	ETC Eos platform software and consoles
ETL	event trace log file	Microsoft
EVT	Windows Event log file	Microsoft Windows NT 4.0 - XP; Microsoft Event Viewer
EVTX	Windows Event log file XML structured	Microsoft Windows Vista, 7, 8; Microsoft Event Viewer
EX	Elixir source code file	Elixir programming language running on BEAM (Erlang virtual machine)
EXE	Directly executable program	DOS, OpenVMS, Microsoft Windows, Symbian or OS/2
EXP	Drawing File format	Drawing Express
EXP	Melco Embroidery Format	Embroidermodder
EXR	OpenEXR raster image format (.exr). Used in digital image manipulation for theatrical film production. EXR is an acronym for Extended Dynamic Range. Stores 16 bit per pixel IEEE HALF-precision floating-point color channels. Can optionally store 32-bit IEEE floating-point "Z" channel depth-buffer components, surface normal directions, or motion vectors.	
EXS	Elixir script file	Interactive Elixir (IEx) shell

== See also ==
- List of filename extensions
- List of file formats
