= Datomic =

Distributed database software

- Original author(s): Rich Hickey, Stuart Halloway, Justin Gehtland
- Developer(s): Cognitect
- Initial release: 2012; 13 years ago
- Stable release: 1.0.7387 / June 27, 2025; 38 days ago
- Written in: Clojure
- Type: Datalog, NoSQL
- License: Apache 2.0 (binaries only)
- Website: datomic.com

Datomic is a distributed database and implementation of Datalog. It has ACID transactions, joins, and a logical query language, Datalog. A distinguishing feature of Datomic is that time is a basic feature of data entities.

== Architecture ==
It has been designed for first-class use with JVM languages such as Java and Clojure.

In its reference architecture, Datomic uses peers and transactors which run on the JVM.
