= Exercism =

Platform offering code practice and mentorship

Exercism website

- Area served: Worldwide
- Founders: Katrina Owen, Jeremy Walker
- Industry: Internet
- Website: exercism.org
- Commercial: No
- Registration: Yes
- Users: 1,900,000 (May 2024)
- Launched: 2013
- Current status: Active

Exercism is an online, open-source, free coding platform that offers code practice and mentorship on 77 different programming languages.

== History ==
Software developer Katrina Owen created Exercism while she was teaching programming at Jumpstart Labs. The platform was developed as an internal tool to solve the problem of her own students not receiving feedback on the coding problems they were practicing. Katrina put the site publicly online and found that people were sharing it with their friends, practicing together and giving each other feedback. Within 12 months, the site had organically grown to see over 6,000 users had submitted code or feedback, and hundreds of volunteers contribute to the languages or tooling on the platform.

In 2016, Jeremy Walker joined as co-founder and CEO. In July 2018, the site was relaunched with a new design and centered around a formal mentoring mode, at which point Katrina stepped back from day-to-day involvement.

== Product ==
In the past, the website differed from other coding platforms by requiring students to download exercises through a command line client, solve the code on their own computers then submit the solution for feedback, at which point they can also view other's solutions to the same problem. Since its second relaunch in 2021, solutions can be edited and submitted through a web editor, though the command line client remains available.

Exercism has tracks for 74 programming languages. Among the notable languages taught: ABAP, C, C#, C++, CoffeeScript, Delphi, Elm, Erlang, F#, Gleam, Go, Java, JavaScript, Julia, Kotlin, Objective-C, PHP, Python, Raku, Red, Ruby, Rust, Scala, Swift, and V (Vlang).

In 2023, the site launched a "12 in 23" challenge for users to learn the basics of 12 different languages - one per month in 2023.

== Open source ==
Exercism software
- Available in: Ruby on Rails
- License: GNU Affero General Public License v3.0
- Repository: https://github.com/exercism/website

The Exercism codebase is open source. In April 2016, it consisted of 50 repositories including website code, API code, command-line code and, most of all, over 40 stand-alone repositories for different language tracks.

As of February 2024 Exercism has 14,344 contributors, maintains 366 repositories, and 19,603 mentors.
