= E57 =

E57 may refer to:

- European route E57
- Nimzo-Indian Defense, Encyclopaedia of Chess Openings code
- A file format (and its filename extension) developed by ASTM International for storing point clouds and images
- A German air-raid siren
