= FSSF =

FSSF may refer to:

- FSSF, the joint Canadian-U.S. First Special Service Force Devil's Brigade
- FSSF, the ICAO airport code for Frégate Island Airport, an airfield serving Frégate Island in the Seychelles
- FSSF, the F# Software Foundation, promoting the F# programming language
