= Phoenix (web framework) =

Web framework written in Elixir

- Original author: Chris McCord
- Stable release: 1.8.0 / 5 August 2025; 5 months ago
- Repository: github.com/phoenixframework/phoenix
- Written in: Elixir
- Platform: BEAM
- Type: Web framework
- License: MIT License
- Website: www.phoenixframework.org

Phoenix is a web development framework written in the functional programming language Elixir.

== Details ==
Phoenix uses a server-side model–view–controller (MVC) pattern. Based on the Plug library, and ultimately the Erlang HTTP server Cowboy, it was developed to provide highly performant and scalable web applications. In addition to the request/response functionality provided by the underlying Cowboy server, Phoenix provides soft realtime communication to external clients through WebSockets or long polling using its language agnostic channels feature.

Two notable features of Phoenix are LiveView and HEEx. LiveView provides real-time user experiences with server-rendered HTML over HTTP and WebSocket. HEEx is Phoenix's templating language which provides HTML-aware compile time checking.

== See also ==
- Comparison of web frameworks
- Mix (build tool)
