= WebSharper =

Web development software

- Original author(s): Intellifactory
- Initial release: 2008
- Stable release: 4.5.14 / May 29, 2019
- Written in: F#
- Operating system: Linux, Windows, Mac OS X, Android, iOS, Windows Phone
- Available in: F#, C#
- Type: Ajax framework
- License: Apache License 2.0, Commercial
- Website: websharper.com

WebSharper is an open-source and commercial web-programming framework that allows web developers to create and maintain complex JavaScript and HTML5 front-end applications in the F# programming language. Other than a few native libraries, everything is F# source.

== Overview ==
WebSharper includes support for jQuery, HTML5, DOM and EcmaScript. WebSharper Mobile includes support for Android, iOS and Windows Phone Formlets and Sitelets.

Unlike many other web-programming toolkits, WebSharper offers a rich set of abstractions and DSL syntax for common web-related chores, such as composing HTML, defining web forms, managing required resources and handling URLs safely.

=== Extensions ===
WebSharper extensions include

- Bing Maps
- DHTMLX
- Ext JS
- Formlets for jQuery UI
- Formlets for jQuery Mobile
- GlMatrix
- Google Maps
- Google Visualization
- InfoVis
- jQuery Mobile
- jQuery Tools
- jQuery UI
- Kendo UI
- Modernizr
- O3D
- Protovis
- Raphaël
- Sencha Touch
- TinyMCE
- Twitter
- WebGL
- YUI Library

=== Development environments ===
WebSharper can be used with any text editor. WebSharper can also be used with Visual Studio 2008/2010/2012 templates with full ASP.NET integration and with MonoDevelop.

== Mobile ==
As a general framework for making web apps, WebSharper is also capable of being used as a framework for making mobile and tablet apps, either by making the needed widgets and animations from scratch, or by using one of the mobile frameworks for WebSharper. An HTML5 app written in WebSharper can have separate views for Tablets and Mobile phones.

== Examples ==
The following sample displays a single HTML paragraph:

[<JavaScript>]
let Main () = Div [ P [Text "Welcome"] ]

The matching server-side code is also written in F#:

type HelloWorldViewer() =
    inherit Web.Control()
  
    [<JavaScript>]
    override this.Body = HelloWorld.Main () :> Html.IPagelet

== See also ==
- F#
- Comparison of JavaScript frameworks
- Comparison of web frameworks
