= Eugen Rochko =

German software developer (born 1993)

- Евгений Рочко
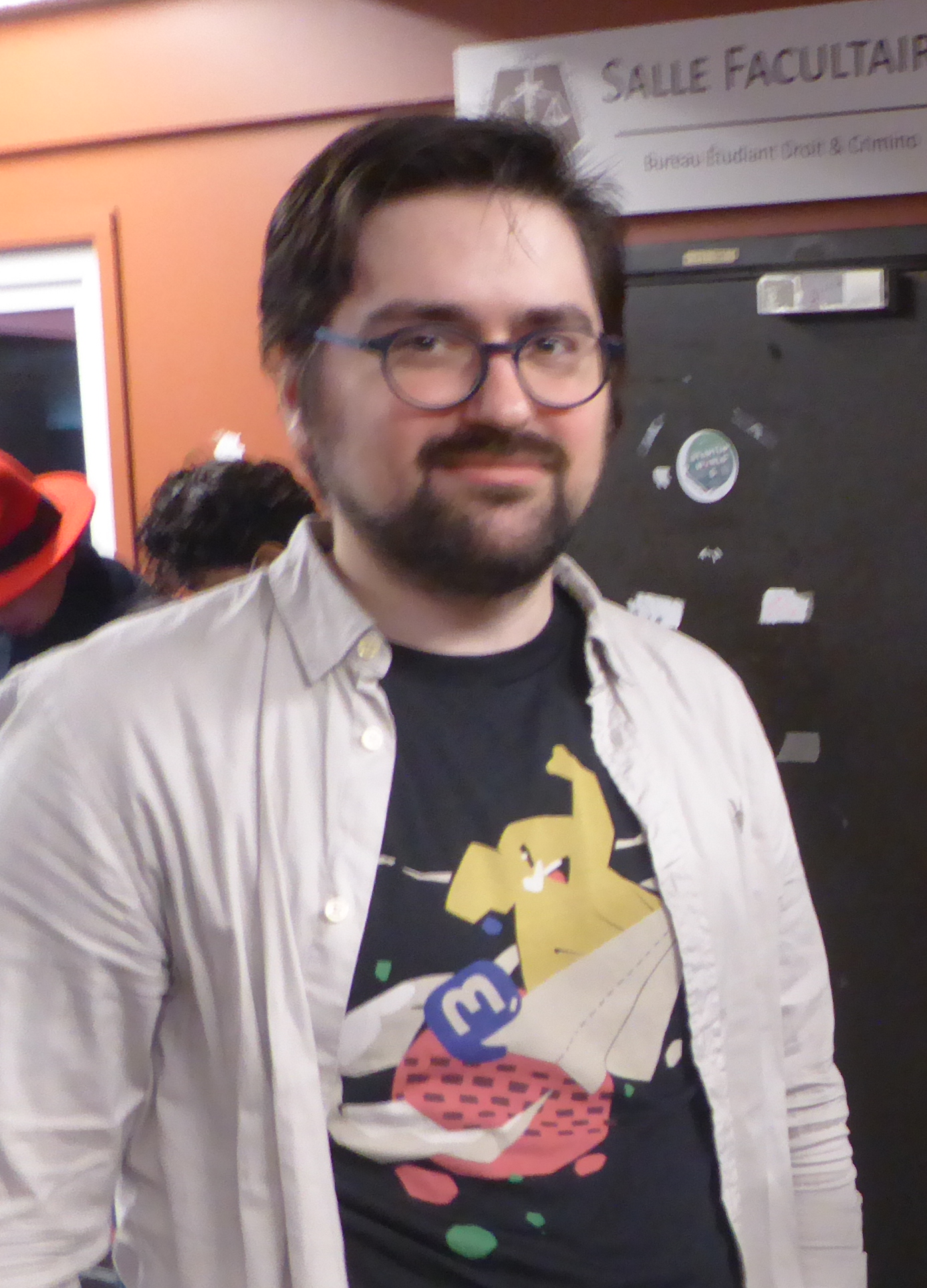
- Rochko in 2024
- Born: 22 January 1993 (age 33); Moscow, Russia
- Other name: Gargron
- Citizenship: Germany
- Website: eugenrochko.com

Eugen Rochko (Russian: Евгений Рочко, romanized: Yevgeniy Rochko; born 22 January 1993) is a German software developer and founder of Mastodon.

== Early life ==
Rochko was born in Moscow, Russia into a Russian Jewish family, on 22 January 1993, and moved to Germany at the age of 11. He attended grammar school in Jena and studied computer science at the University of Jena. In his youth, he was active on networks such as MySpace, schülerVZ, Facebook, Twitter, and ICQ. During his high school years, he created several websites including the virtual marketplace Artists&Clients which he sold for US$2,000.

== Career ==
In early 2016, while studying, Rochko started working on the Mastodon software. He launched Mastodon in beta version that year, and published the software in October 2016 upon the completion of his degree. By April 2017, there were 1,000 independently run "instances" on Mastodon's federated social network platform with "hundreds of thousands of users" using personal and public servers, according to a June 2017 Free Software Foundation (FSF) interview. Because the software is open source, anyone can use it to create their own server with customized and enforced rules and regulations. These individual servers are part of the federated social network known as the fediverse.

Rochko developed Mastodon with crowdfunding through Patreon and OpenCollective, and an open-source development grant from Samsung, as well as a small grant from the European Commission. He published it in early October 2016 after completing his computer science studies at the University of Jena. He later implemented the ActivityPub protocol for Mastodon. By May 2017, there were already 323 volunteer GitHub contributors; only a dozen were regular contributors. Rochko and one other person merged pull requests made by volunteers into Mastodon's master branch. By July 2017, there were 727 individuals supporting Mastodon on Patreon. At that time Rochko self-described as Mastodon's main developer and project manager, working alongside @maloki@mastodon.social, Mastodon's project manager. The rest of the work was undertaken by volunteers.

In a 6 November 2022 Time interview, Rochko said he started it as a side project while working on his degree. In a Reuters interview Rochko said he was motivated by rumours that Peter Thiel, a "right-wing billionaire", was considering acquiring Twitter. Rochko said that it was crucial that this "de facto public utility that isn't public" should not be controlled by a US corporation. He was dissatisfied with some of the social media platform's functions. Rochko said that a platform like Twitter plays an important role in democracy and should not be controlled by a US corporation. According to his 2018 Esquire interview, he was motivated to create Mastodon to provide a space that was not commercial and was more curated than Twitter. In June 2017 Rochko told an interviewer that he loved free software and this, along with his growing dissatisfaction with Twitter, had also been factors in his creation of Mastodon.

A Daily Dot article by reporter Ana Valens, who focuses on issues such as queer communities and adult content, said that by November 2016, following the election of Donald Trump, Mastodon had attracted many people in the queer community. These early adopters appreciated the potential of the "decentralized fediverse" as a form of protection for marginalized users. They volunteered in many roles including project management and open source software development. Valens said that Rochko's—and by extension Mastodon's—"hyperfixation on avoiding politics" where a content warning (CW) was added to posts about politics, harmed people of colour and other marginalized groups, whose identities, Valens said, were "inherently political". Valens said that by 2019, there were two competing camps at Mastodon—the marginalized queers and "white, well-off, and male tech workers" whose views aligned with Rochko. She described Rochko as a benevolent dictator for life (BDFL)—a term given to some open source software developers who retain a final say in decisions. In his interview for the Daily Dot article, Rochko said that he did not see BDFL as a "harsh description" of Mastodon but as a programming term describing a form of governance that Rochko felt was more efficient than "rule by committee".

In a November 2019 interview with mint in the week following the influx of 26,000 new members from India who had exited Twitter for "opaque moderation policies, censoring government critics and failing to control hate speech", Rochko said that Mastodon had extended its policy of "not condoning casteism" as well as "racism, sexism, homophobia or transphobia" Rochko said that, compared to Twitter, Mastodon had a "higher ratio of moderator-to-users" who monitor posts.

Five years after its creation, in August 2021 Rochko announced that he had incorporated Mastodon as a non-profit Gesellschaft mit beschränkter Haftung (gGmbH)—the most common German form of non-profit LLC—as founder and sole shareholder. All of Mastodon's income sources and activities were transferred to this new legal entity, with Rochko as CEO and employee on a fixed wage. In 2025, Mastodon announced Rochko would relinquish management control with the establishment of community governance in a nonprofit structure.

In previous open-source projects, Rochko had used the widely used free software license GNU General Public License (GPL), originally written by Free Software Foundation's founder, Richard Stallman. For Mastodon, he chose the GNU Affero General Public License for network software that provides network clients with access to the software's source. In 2019, the far-right social network Gab began to use Mastodon's open source software under this license, which they breached. Rochko said that the Mastodon server covenant mandating "active moderation against racism, sexism, homophobia, and transphobia" prohibits any such use of the open source software. He said Gab's developers had severed ties with the Mastodon development process. According to Rochko, Gab developers immediately complied with Mastodon's cease and desist letter on 21 October 2021 in regards to Gab's AGPLv3 license breach. Gab updated their archive of their source code which had been password-protected. Truth Social also used Mastodon's code.

When Elon Musk took over Twitter in 2022, users flocked to Mastodon, with 230,000 new members in the first week of November. A Forbes article quoted Rochko saying he was optimistic that people who left Twitter for Mastodon would "enjoy a different kind of social media experience".

On 18 November 2025, Rochko stepped down as the CEO of Mastodon. The organisation chose to reward Rochko with a one-time compensation of 1 million Euro for his past contributions to the project.
