= CAEX =

Data format

CAEX (Computer Aided Engineering Exchange) is a neutral data format that allows storage of hierarchical object information, e.g. the hierarchical architecture of a plant. On a certain abstraction level, a plant consists of modules or components that are interconnected. CAEX allows storage of those modules or components by means of objects. Object oriented concepts such as encapsulation, classes, class libraries, instances, instance hierarchies, inheritance, relations, attributes and interfaces are explicitly supported. CAEX bases on XML and is defined as an XML schema (xsd file). The original intention of developing CAEX was to remedy industry's lack of a common and established data exchange between process engineering tools and process control engineering tools. However, CAEX can be applied to all types of static object information, e.g. plant topologies, document topologies, product topologies, petri nets. It can also be used for non-technical applications like phylogenetic trees.

== Technical features ==
CAEX combines model-techniques with meta-model-techniques. The model-techniques allow storage of object information that is common across different vendors, e.g. objects, attributes, interfaces, hierarchies, references, libraries and classes. The meta-model-techniques allow a flexible definition of object information that is usually individual and application dependent, e.g. certain attribute names, specific classes or object catalogues. CAEX is mainly a static data format and not designed for storage of dynamic information. However, it is possible to define special classes for the description of dynamic behaviour.

== History ==
CAEX development started in 2002 as a university project at RWTH Aachen at the chair of process control engineering (Prof. U. Epple) with the industrial support of ABB corporate research Ladenburg. In 2003, the first CAEX proposal was submitted to the German standardization committee DKE K941 (TC65, WG12). In 2004, CAEX was published as part of the DIN V 44366. After a positive international vote, CAEX was published as part of the IEC PAS 62424 in May 2005. In 2007, the next IEC standardization step was passed, and it was published as IEC 62424 CDV (Committee Draft for Voting). On 12 August 2008, the final version of IEC 62424 (Ed. 1.0) was published.

== Status ==
CAEX is currently available as CAEX Version 3 (Version 3).

== Partners ==
- CAEX was developed within the DKE K 941 together with major industrial partners of the process industry; Bayer, BASF, Linde, Uhde, Wacker, Intergraph, Innotec, ABB and the RWTH Aachen.
- In the manufacturing automation area, CAEX serves as top level data format for the new neutral data exchange format AutomationML driven by Daimler, Siemens, KUKA, Rockwell and ABB .

== Applications ==
CAEX is currently applied in the areas of process engineering, process control engineering, the oil & gas industry, and manufacturing automation engineering. The following research institutes are especially involved in the investigation of CAEX (Status 2007).

- RWTH Aachen
- HSU Hamburg
- TU Dresden
- Fraunhofer Institute for Information and Data Processing (IITB)
- Imperial College London
- Johannes Kepler University Linz
- AutomationML consortium

== See also ==
- AutomationML
