= AutomationML =

Neutral data format

AutomationML (Automation Markup Language) is a neutral data format based on XML for the storage and exchange of plant engineering information, which is provided as an open standard. The goal of AutomationML is to interconnect the heterogeneous tool landscape of modern engineering tools in their different disciplines, like mechanical plant engineering, electrical design, HMI development, PLC and robot control.

== Approach ==
AutomationML describes real plant components as objects encapsulating different aspects. An object can consist out of other sub-objects, and can itself be part of a bigger composition. It can describe a screw, a claw, a robot or a complete manufacturing cell in different levels of detail. Typical objects in plant automation comprise information about topology, geometry, kinematics and logic, where logic comprises sequencing, behaviour and control.

AutomationML incorporates different standards through strongly typed links across the formats:

1. Topology implemented with CAEX (IEC 62424)
  Properties and relations of objects in their hierarchical structure
2. Geometry implemented with COLLADA of the Khronos Group
  Graphical attributes and 3D information
3. Kinematics implemented with COLLADA
  Connections and dependencies among objects to support motion planning
4. Logic implemented with PLCopen XML
  Sequences of actions, internal behavior of objects and I/O connections

For future extensions, AutomationML is designed to integrate further formats using the same referencing mechanism.

== History ==
After first evaluations of exchange formats, Daimler initiated the joint activity of the companies ABB, KUKA, Rockwell Automation and Siemens together with netAllied and Zühlke as well as the Karlsruhe Institute of Technology (KIT) and the University of Magdeburg in October 2006 to define and standardize the Automation Markup Language (AutomationML) as an intermediate format for the Digital Factory. In April 2009, an independent organization was founded. The Fraunhofer IOSB institute became the first new member. AutomationML is available as open standard free of charge.

== See also ==
- Open Packaging Conventions
- CAEX
- Collada
