= Rich Hickey =

Computer programmer and creator of Clojure

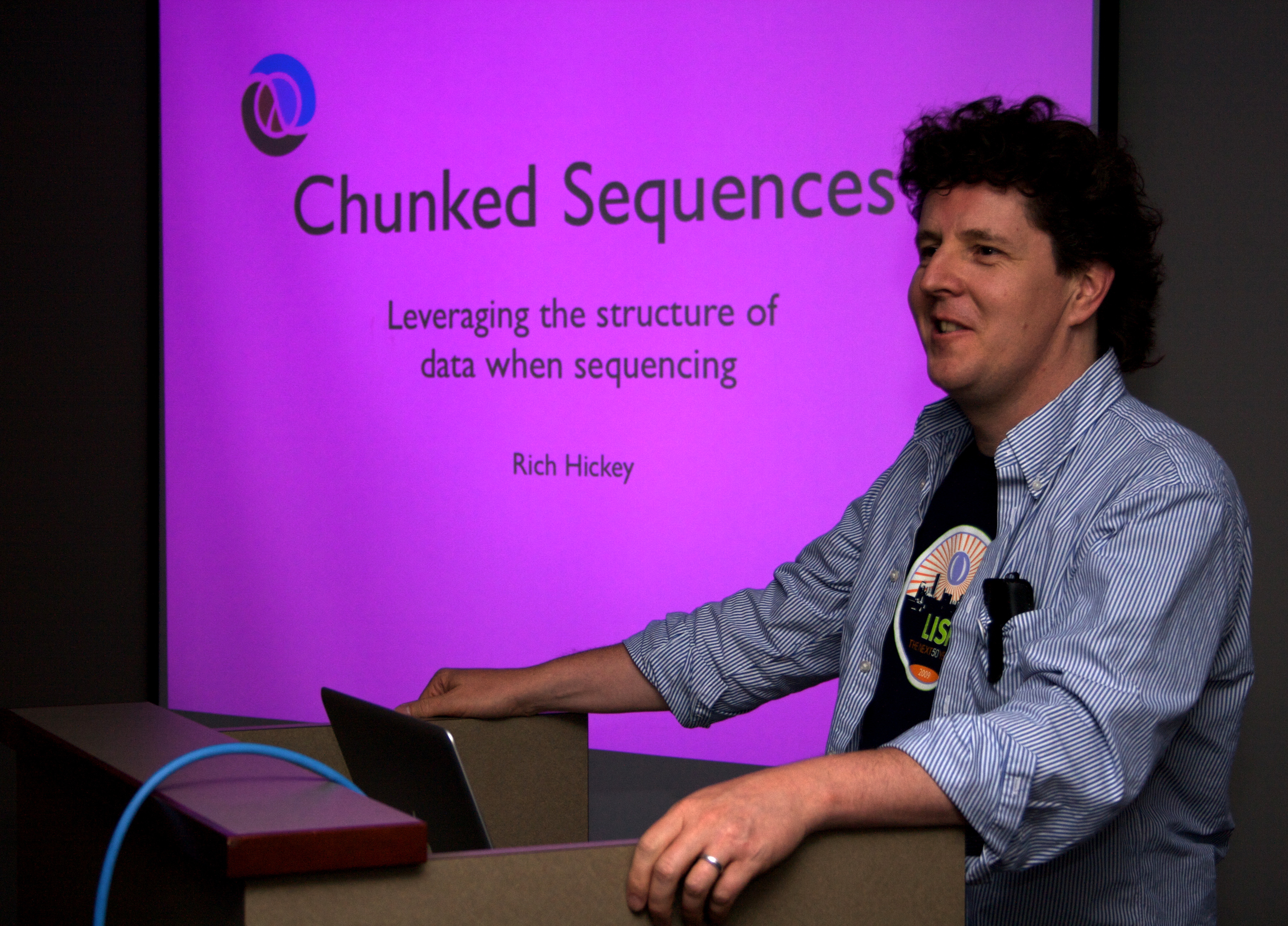
Rich Hickey in San Francisco

Rich Hickey is a computer programmer and speaker, known as the creator of the Clojure programming language.

== Biography ==
Clojure is a Lisp dialect built on top of the Java Virtual Machine. He also created or designed ClojureScript and the Extensible Data Notation (EDN) data format.

Before Clojure, he developed dotLisp, a similar project based on the .NET Framework. Hickey has also worked on scheduling systems, broadcast automation, audio analysis and fingerprinting, database design, yield management, exit poll systems, and machine listening.

He spent about 2½ years working on Clojure, much of that time working exclusively on Clojure without external funding, before releasing it to the world in 2007. In 2012, Datomic, a proprietary distributed database was launched which coincided with the incorporation of Cognitect. From 2013 until 2020, he was the chief technology officer of Cognitect. Cognitect was acquired by Nubank in 2020, and he was a Distinguished Engineer at Nubank until August 2023 when he announced his retirement from commercial software development.

== Quotes ==
"Programmers know the benefits of everything and the tradeoffs of nothing."

== Papers ==
- Rich Hickey (February 1995), "Callbacks in C++ using template functors", C++ Report, 7 (2): 43–50. Reprinted in Stanley B. Lippman, ed. (January 1996). C++ Gems: Programming Pearls from The C++ Report (SIGS Reference Library). pp. 515–537. ISBN 978-1-884842-37-5.
- Rich Hickey (June 2020), "A History of Clojure", Proc. ACM Program. Lang 4, HOPL, Article 71
