= Don Syme =

Australian computer scientist

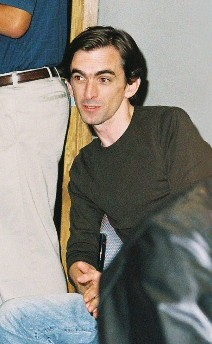
Don Syme in 2006

Don Syme is an Australian computer scientist and a Principal Researcher at GitHub. He is the designer and architect of the F# programming language, described by a reporter as being regarded as "the most original new face in computer languages since Bjarne Stroustrup developed C++ in the early 1980s.". Syme originally created F# as a port of OCaml to Microsoft's .NET Framework. He is a visiting Professor at King's College London.

Earlier, Syme created generics in the .NET Common Language Runtime, including the initial design of generics for the C# programming language, along with others including Andrew Kennedy and later Anders Hejlsberg. Kennedy, Syme and Dachuan Yu also formalized this widely used system.

Since 2022, he has worked at GitHub Next on artificial intelligence for software engineering, including Continuous AI, GitHub Agentic Workflows and Copilot Workspace.. Previously he has worked on formal specification, interactive proof, automated verification and proof description languages.

He holds a Ph.D. from the University of Cambridge, and is a member of the IFIP working group on functional programming. He is a co-author of the book Expert F# 4.0.

In 2015, he was honored with a Silver Medal from the Royal Academy of Engineering.

== See also ==
- F# Software Foundation
