= Joe Armstrong (programmer) =

British computer scientist (1950–2019)

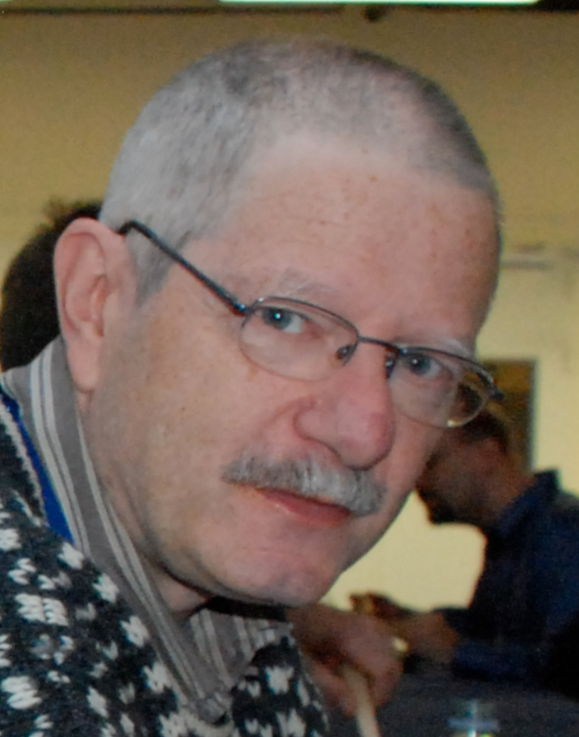
- Armstrong in 2009
- Born: 27 December 1950; Bournemouth, England, UK
- Died: 20 April 2019 (aged 68)
- Education: University College London, UK; Royal Institute of Technology (KTH), Stockholm, Sweden
- Occupations: Computer programmer, professor, author
- Known for: Co-creator of the Erlang programming language
- Spouse: Helen Taylor
- Children: Thomas Armstrong, Claire Armstrong
- Scientific career
- Workplaces: University of Edinburgh; Ericsson Computer Science Lab; KTH
- Website: joearms.github.io

Joseph Leslie Armstrong (27 December 1950 – 20 April 2019) was a computer scientist working in the area of fault-tolerant distributed systems. He is one of the co-designers of the Erlang programming language.

== Early life and education ==
Armstrong was born in Bournemouth, England in 1950.

At 17, Armstrong began programming in Fortran on his local council's mainframe.

Armstrong graduated with a B.Sc. in Physics from University College London in 1972.

He received a Ph.D. in Computer Science from the Royal Institute of Technology (KTH) in Stockholm, Sweden in 2003. His dissertation was titled Making reliable distributed systems in the presence of software errors. He was a professor at KTH from 2014 until his death.

== Career ==
After briefly working for Donald Michie at the University of Edinburgh, Armstrong moved to Sweden in 1974 and joined the Ericsson Computer Science Laboratory at Kista in 1984.

Peter Seibel wrote:

Originally a physicist, he switched to computer science when he ran out of money in the middle of his physics PhD and landed a job as a researcher working for Donald Michie — one of the founders of the field of artificial intelligence in Britain. At Michie's lab, Armstrong was exposed to the full range of AI goodies, becoming a founding member of the British Robotics Association and writing papers about robotic vision. When funding for AI dried up as a result of the famous Lighthill report, it was back to physics-related programming for more than half a decade, first at the EISCAT scientific association and later the Swedish Space Corporation, before finally joining the Ericsson Computer Science Lab where he invented Erlang.

It was at Ericsson in 1986, that he worked with Robert Virding and Mike Williams, to invent the Erlang programming language, which was released as open source in 1998.

== Personal life ==
Armstrong married Helen Taylor in 1977. They had two children, Thomas and Claire.

== Death ==
Armstrong died on 20 April 2019 from an infection which was complicated by pulmonary fibrosis.

== Publications ==
- 2007. Programming Erlang: Software for a Concurrent World. Pragmatic Bookshelf ISBN 978-1934356005.
- 2013. Programming Erlang: Software for a Concurrent World. Second edition. Pragmatic Bookshelf ISBN 978-1937785536.
