= F Sharp Software Foundation =

Nonprofit organization for F#

F# Software Foundation
- Abbreviation: FSSF
- Formation: December 2014; 11 years ago
- Type: 501(c)(3) non-profit organization
- Purpose: Promote, protect, and advance the F# programming language, and to support and facilitate the growth of a diverse and international community of F# programmers.
- Headquarters: Nevada, United States
- Region served: Worldwide
- Members: 1831
- Official language: English
- Executive director: Reed Copsey, Jr.
- Vice chairperson of the board of trustees: Elliot Brown
- Parent organization: Microsoft
- Affiliations: Microsoft
- Website: foundation.fsharp.org

The F# Software Foundation (FSSF) is a non-profit organization devoted to the F# programming language. It was founded at the beginning of 2013 and became a 501(c)(3) non-profit organization in December 2014. The mission of the foundation is to foster development of the F# community and is responsible for various processes within the F# community, including assisting development of the core F# distribution and libraries, managing intellectual rights, and raising funds.

The current board of trustees and officers of the FSSF are listed below:

== Officers ==
- Chairperson of the board of trustees: Ryan Coy
- Secretary of the board of trustees: Houston Haynes
- Secretary: Mathias Brandewinder
- Treasurer: Paulmichael Blasucci
- Executive director: Reed Copsey Jr.
- Technical advisor: Don Syme

== Board of trustees ==
- Kevin Avignon
- Phillip Carter
- Ryan Coy
- Houston Haynes
- Janne Siera

The executive director and technical advisor roles serve as ex-officio, non-voting members of the board of trustees.
