= Cloud-computing comparison =

The following is a comparison of cloud-computing software and providers.

== IaaS (Infrastructure as a service) ==
=== Providers ===
==== General ====
| Provider | Launched | Block storage | Assignable IPs | SMTP support | IOPS Guaranteed minimum | Security | Locations | Notes |
|---|---|---|---|---|---|---|---|---|
| Google Cloud Platform | 2013 | Yes | No | No | Yes | Yes | br, ca, cl, us, be, ch, de, es, fi, it, po, nl, uk, il, au, cn, in, jp, sg, id, tw | SMTP blocked. |
| Oracle Cloud | 2014 | Yes | Yes | Yes | Yes | Yes | us, ca, br, de, uk, nl, ch, in, aus, jp, kr, saud | |
| Amazon Web Services | 2006 | Yes | Yes | Partial | Yes | Yes | us, ca, br, ie, de, uk, cn, sg, au, jp, kr, in, za, fr, se, bh, hk, it, id | List of bugs |
| IBM Cloud | 2005 | Yes | Yes | No | Yes | Yes | us, gb, fr, de, nl, in, au, hk, kr, it, jp, no, sg | |
| Microsoft Azure | 2010 | Yes | Yes | Yes | Yes | Yes | ca, us, br, ie, nl, de, uk, cn, au, jp, in, kr, sg, hk, za, id | List of bugs |
| GoDaddy | 2016 | No | | | No | Yes | | |
| Rackspace | 1998 | Partial | No | Yes | No | Yes | us, au, hk | root volume is a fixed size |
| OVH | 1999 | Yes | Yes | Yes | Yes | Yes | au, ca, de, fr, gb, pl, us, sg | |
| Atlantic.Net | 2010 | No | | Yes | No | Yes | us, uk, ca | |
| Scaleway | 2016 | Yes | Yes | Yes | Yes | Yes | fr, nl | |
| Alibaba Cloud | 2009 | Yes | Yes | Yes | Yes | Yes | cn, hk, sg, au, my, id, in, jp, us, de, uk, ae | |
| Hetzner Cloud | | Yes | | | | Yes | de, fi, us, sg | |
| Safe Swiss Cloud | 2013 | Yes | Yes | | Yes | Yes | ch | |
| DigitalOcean | 2016 | Partial | Yes | Partial | | Yes | sg, nl, uk, ca, de, in | SMTP for accounts older than 60 days but they use spam mandrillapp servers. root volume is a fixed size. |
| BlackBox Hosting | 2013 | Yes | Yes | Yes | Yes | Yes | uk | |

== SaaS (Software as a Service) ==
=== General ===
| SaaS (Software as a Service) | Initial release date | License(s) | Written in | As a service | Local installations |
|---|---|---|---|---|---|
| fluid Operations eCloudManager | 2009-03-01 | Proprietary | Java, Groovy | No | Yes |
| AppScale | 2009-03-07 | Apache License | Python, Ruby, Go | Yes | Yes |
| Cloud Foundry | 2011-04-12 | Apache License | Ruby, C, Java, Go | Yes | Yes |
| Cloud.com / CloudStack | 2010-05-04 | Apache license | Java, C | Yes | Yes |
| Eucalyptus | 2008-05-29 | Proprietary, GPL v3 | Java, C | Yes | Yes |
| Nimbus | 2009-01-09 | Apache License | Java, Python | Yes | Yes |
| OpenNebula | 2008-03-?? | Apache License | C++, C, Ruby, Java, Shell script, lex, yacc | Yes | Yes |
| OpenQRM | 2008-03-?? | GPL License | C++, PHP, Shell script | Yes | Yes |
| OpenShift | 2011-05-04 | Apache License | Go | Yes | Yes |
| OpenStack | 2010-10-21 | Apache License | Python | Yes | Yes |
| OnApp | 2010-07-01 | Proprietary | Java, Ruby, C++ | Yes | Yes |
| oVirt | 2012-08-09 | Apache License | Java, Python | ? | Yes |
| Jelastic | 2011-01-27 | GPL License, Apache License, BSD License | Java, JavaScript, Perl, Shell script | Yes | Yes |

=== Supported hosts ===
| Software | Linux | FreeBSD | Windows | Bare Metal |
|---|---|---|---|---|
| AppScale | ? | ? | ? | |
| Cloud Foundry | Yes | No | Yes | Yes |
| Cloud.com / CloudStack | Yes | No | Yes | Yes |
| Eucalyptus | Yes | No | No | Yes |
| Nimbus | Yes | ? | No | No |
| OpenNebula | Yes | No | ? | No |
| OpenQRM | Yes | No | No | No |
| OpenShift | Yes | No | No | Yes |
| OpenStack | Yes | No | Yes | Yes |
| OnApp | Yes | No | No | Yes |
| oVirt | Yes | No | No | Yes |

=== Supported guests ===
| Software | Linux | Windows | VMware | Xen | KVM | VirtualBox | Docker | Other |
|---|---|---|---|---|---|---|---|---|
| fluid Operations | Yes | Yes | Yes | Yes | Yes | No | ? | |
| AppScale | ? | ? | Yes | Yes | Yes | Yes | ? | |
| Cloud Foundry | Yes | Yes | Yes | Yes | Yes | Yes | Yes | |
| Cloud.com / CloudStack | Yes | Yes | Yes | Yes | Yes | Yes | ? | |
| Eucalyptus | Yes | Yes | Yes | Yes | Yes | ? | ? | Any guest OS supported by Xen, KVM, or VMWare |
| Nimbus | Yes | ? | ? | Yes | Yes | ? | ? | |
| OpenNebula | Yes | Yes | Yes | Yes | Yes | Yes | ? | Any guest OS supported by Xen, KVM, or VMWare |
| OpenQRM | Yes | Yes | Yes | Yes | Yes | Yes | ? | |
| OpenShift | Yes | No | Yes | Yes | Yes | Yes | ? | |
| OpenStack | Yes | Yes | Yes | Yes | Yes | No | Yes | |
| OnApp | Yes | Yes | Yes | Yes | Yes | No | ? | JumpBox, FreeBSD |
| oVirt | Yes | Yes | No | No | Yes | No | ? | |
| Jelastic | ? | ? | ? | ? | ? | ? | Yes | Parallels Virtuozzo Containers |

== PaaS (Platform as a service) ==
=== Providers ===
| Provider | Launched | SaaS |
|---|---|---|
| Appian | 1999 | |
| Cloud Foundry | 2011 | |
| CloudBees | 2010 | Java, JRails and Grails, Jenkins |
| Computer Sciences Corporation | | |
| Engine Yard | 2006 | |
| Heroku | 2008 | Ruby, Java, Node.js, Scala, Clojure, Python, PHP, and Go. |
| Oracle Cloud Platform | 2014 | |
| PythonAnywhere | 2012 | Python |
| Salesforce App Cloud | | |

=== Providers on IaaS ===
PaaS providers which can run on IaaS providers ("itself" means the provider is both PaaS and IaaS):

| Software | Amazon EC2 | Rackspace | GoGrid | Mail.Ru (MCS) | Other |
|---|---|---|---|---|---|
| AppScale | Yes | ? | ? | ? | |
| Cloud Foundry | Yes | Yes | ? | ? | |
| Cloud.com | ? | ? | ? | ? | itself |
| Eucalyptus | ? | ? | ? | ? | itself |
| fluid Operations | ? | ? | ? | ? | |
| Nimbus | ? | ? | ? | ? | itself |
| OnApp | ? | ? | ? | ? | itself |
| OpenNebula | ? | ? | ? | ? | itself |
| OpenQRM | ? | ? | ? | ? | itself |
| OpenShift | Yes | ? | ? | ? | Safe Swiss Cloud |
| OpenStack | Yes | Yes | Yes | Yes | Safe Swiss Cloud |
