= Content management system =

Software for managing digital content

A content management system (CMS) is a computer software used to create, manage, modify, and publish digital content (content management). It is commonly used for enterprise content management (ECM), which integrates functions such as document management, digital asset management, and records retention for collaborative use within organizations. It is also used for web content management (WCM), which enables the collaborative creation and maintenance of websites containing text, images, video, audio, maps, and other digital media.

== Structure ==
A CMS typically has two major components: a content management application (CMA), as the front-end user interface that allows a user, even with limited expertise, to add, modify, and remove content from a website without the intervention of a webmaster; and a content delivery application (CDA), which compiles the content and updates the website.

== Installation type ==
There are two types of CMS installation: on-premises and cloud-based. On-premises installation means that the CMS software can be installed on the server. Notable CMSs which can be installed on-premises are Drupal, Grav, Joomla, ModX, Wordpress.org and others. The cloud-based CMS is hosted in the vendor's cloud environment.

Cloud-based content management systems abstract infrastructure management from the content management application. In platforms such as WordPress.com, the CMS is delivered as a managed service in which server provisioning, operating system maintenance, application updates, backups, and security are integrated into the hosting environment, eliminating the need for users to administer the underlying software stack.

Publishing architectures vary significantly between systems. Traditional coupled CMSs tie the content repository to a single presentation layer, suiting organisations publishing to one channel. Headless CMSs separate the repository from presentation entirely, delivering content via APIs to websites, mobile applications, digital signage, or voice interfaces from a single source, an approach that has grown rapidly alongside the proliferation of digital touchpoints. Authoring environments typically enforce structured workflows in which content passes through defined review and approval stages before publication, with role-based permissions controlling what each user can create, edit, or publish.

== Publishing architectures ==
Content management systems may be categorized according to how content is stored and delivered. Traditional (or coupled) CMSs integrate content authoring, storage, and presentation into a single application, with content typically published directly to a website managed by the CMS. In contrast, decoupled CMSs separate the content management back end from the presentation layer while still providing a dedicated publishing environment. Headless CMSs remove the presentation layer entirely, exposing content through application programming interfaces (APIs) such as REST or GraphQL for delivery to websites, mobile applications, digital signage, and other digital channels.

== Content modeling ==
Many content management systems organize information using structured content models rather than treating pages solely as free-form documents. A content model defines reusable content types, such as articles, products, events, or authors, each consisting of predefined fields and metadata. Structured content enables information to be reused consistently across websites, mobile applications, search services, and other digital platforms, while facilitating automation, personalization, and omnichannel publishing.

== Common features ==
The core CMS features are: indexing, search and retrieval, format management, revision control and management. Features may vary depending on the system application but will typically include:

- Intuitive indexing, search, and retrieval features index all data for easy access through search functions and allow users to search by attributes such as publication dates, keywords or author.
- Format management facilitates turning scanned paper documents and legacy electronic documents into HTML or PDF documents.
- Revision features allow content to be updated and edited after initial publication. Revision control also tracks any changes made to files by individuals.
- Publishing functionality allows individuals to use a template or a set of templates approved by the organization, as well as wizards and other tools to create or modify content.

Popular additional features may include:

- SEO-friendly URLs
- Integrated and online help, including discussion boards
- Group-based permission systems
- Full template support and customizable templates
- Easy wizard-based install and versioning procedures
- Admin panel with multiple language support
- Content hierarchy with unlimited depth and size
- Minimal server requirements
- Integrated file managers
- Integrated audit logs
- Support AMP page for Google
- Support schema markup
- Designed as per Google quality guidelines for website architecture
- Availability of plug-ins for additional functionalities.
- Security precautions such as 2 Factor Authentication

== Other types of content management systems ==
Digital asset management systems are another type of CMS. They manage content with clearly defined author or ownership, such as documents, movies, pictures, phone numbers, and scientific data. Companies also use CMSs to store, control, revise, and publish documentation. There are also component content management systems (CCMS), which are CMSs that manage content at a modular level rather than as pages or articles. CCMSs are often used in technical communication, where many publications reuse the same content. Headless CMS, which separates content from its delivery layer, offers greater flexibility in content distribution across various platforms.

== Widely used CMSs ==
According to W3Techs, the most widely used content management system is WordPress, used by 61.7% of websites as of March 2026. Other commonly used content management systems include Shopify, Wix, and Squarespace.

== Cross-reference ==
=== Structure ===
In a document, especially those authored in a content management system, a cross-reference has two major aspects:

- A visible form that appears when the document is presented to the reader
- A technical mechanism that resides within the system

The visible form contains text, graphics, and other indications that:

- Indicate what is being referenced
- Enable the reader to follow the cross-reference to the referenced content
- May enable the reader to understand what is being referred to, or what to expect upon following the reference
- May present to the reader some information from the referenced content

The technical mechanism that resides within the system:

- Identifies what location is being referred to
- Permits the system to present appropriate referencing text when the location containing the reference is presented to a reader
- Permits the system to offer a control (such as a link) that a reader can use when the content is presented in electronic form to access the referenced content

=== Enhancing usability ===
If the cross-reference mechanism is well designed, the reader will be able to follow each cross-reference to the referenced content whether the content is presented in print or electronically.

An author working in a content management system is responsible for identifying subjects of interest that cross documents, and creating appropriate systems of cross-references to support readers who seek to understand those subjects. For an individual cross-reference, an author should ensure that location and content of the target of the cross-reference are clearly identified, and the reader can easily determine how to follow the cross-reference in each medium in which publication is supported.

Content strategy practitioners (known as content strategists) specialize in planning content to meet business needs, taking into account the processes for creating and maintaining the content, and the systems that support the content.

== See also ==
- Content management
- Content Management Interface
- Document management system
- Dynamic web page
- Enterprise content management
- Headless content management system
- HTML
- Information management
- Knowledge management
- LAMP (software bundle)
- List of content management systems
- Personalization management system
- Revision control
- Web application framework
- Web content management system
