= XRX =

XRX may refer to:

- Xerox Holdings (Nasdaq stock ticker: XRX)
- XRX (web application architecture)
