= PMS (disambiguation) =

Premenstrual syndrome (PMS) is a collection of physical, psychological and emotional symptoms related to a woman's menstrual cycle.

PMS may also refer to:

== Computers ==
- Process management system, a system for business process management
- Philip's Music Scribe, music scorewriter software
- Pop'n Music Script, a computer file format for rhythm action games
- Project management software
- Property management system, software for hotel management
- Pavement management#Pavement management systems, software for maintaining a road network
- Personalization management system, software for managing the personalization of online user experiences

== Nationality and politics ==
- Partido Mexicano Socialista, a socialist political party in Mexico
- Presidential Management Staff (Philippines), a government agency
- Prime Ministers, see List of current prime ministers
- Prime Minister's Spokesman, UK civil service post

== Science and medicine ==
- PMS1, a human protein involved in nucleotide mismatch repair
- Medical practice management software, dealing with the management of a medical practice
- Pectoralis minor syndrome
- Postmarketing surveillance, monitoring of a pharmaceutical drug or device
- Pre-main-sequence star, a star that has not yet reached the main sequence
- Phelan-McDermid Syndrome, a rare genetic condition that causes developmental and speech delays, behavioral problems and a weakened ability to feel pain or sweat

== Other uses ==
- PMS Clan, an all-female gaming clan
- Pantone Matching System, a proprietary color space
- Piedmontese language (ISO 639-3 language code), a language used in northwest Italy.
- Pleasanton Unified School District#Pleasanton Middle School, California, USA
- Pontifical Mission Societies, a group of Catholic missionary societies
- Portsmouth & Southsea railway station (National Rail station code), Hampshire, England
- Pretty Mean Sisters, a 1990s stable in the World Wrestling Federation
- Preventive maintenance schedule, a schedule for preventive maintenance
- Pacific Mail Steamship Company
