= Ganeti Web Manager =

- Developer(s): Open Source Lab
- Initial release: 2010; 15 years ago
- Stable release: 0.10.2 / September 9, 2013; 11 years ago
- Written in: Python
- Operating system: Linux
- Platform: Ganeti
- License: GNU GPL v2
- Website: github.com/osuosl/ganeti_webmgr

Ganeti Web Manager is a web-based management interface for the Ganeti solution stack for virtual machine clusters. In 2010 the project was under development at the OSU Open Source Lab which uses Ganeti for hosting open source software projects such as phpBB as well as the Supercell project which provides on-demand virtual machines for software testing. Ganeti Web Manager is free and open-source software, subject to the requirements of the GNU General Public License (GPL), version 2.
