= Personalization management system =

Software application for managing the personalization of online user experiences

A personalization management system (PMS) is an integrated software solution that enables users in an organization to manage and deliver personalized messages, campaigns, and interactive experiences to consumers across different communications channels and devices.

The term PMS was first used in a 2003 study on personalization, but it was later popularized by the startup Croct, which was the first company to use the term PMS to distinguish the emerging category of platforms and technologies focused on delivering personalized customer experiences. Previously, these services were typically included under the umbrella of CMS or CRM solutions, which did not adequately encapsulate the nuances of this new category.

== History ==
The concept of personalization in marketing has been around for decades. But it all began with simple strategies, such as calling consumers by name in direct mail marketing.

In the late 1990s and early 2000s, the concept of personalization began to evolve with the use of cookies, which allowed websites to track a user's browsing history and behavior. This information could then be used to serve personalized content, such as recommended products or tailored advertisements.

As the internet and digital marketing continued to grow, the need for efficient and effective content management systems (CMS) became apparent. One of the main challenges with traditional CMS systems was that they were designed for the web, which often meant that content had to be created multiple times to be delivered across multiple devices. That was both a time-consuming and inefficient process.

To address this issue, the concept of headless CMS was introduced. A headless CMS is a content management system that separates the backend (where content is stored and served) from the frontend (where content is displayed to the user). This allows content to be created once and delivered to any device or platform without creating multiple versions of the same content.

As personalization in marketing evolved, it became important not just to create personalized content but also to analyze and track its effectiveness. Headless CMSs were well-suited to handle this task, as they allow for more flexibility when integrating marketing technology, such as analytics and testing tools. Together, these capabilities led to the emergence of a specialized category known as a Personalization Management System (PMS).

As technology advanced, so has the ability to personalize marketing efforts. Modern PMS platforms now offer a range of sophisticated features and capabilities. Companies such as Microsoft, Netflix, and Spotify are some of the most successful examples of companies using modern personalized marketing strategies nowadays to offer tailored experiences to their customers.

== Benefits ==
Personalization allows businesses to create more targeted, relevant, and timely interactions with their customers and prospects. This can have many benefits, such as:

- Improved customer engagement and loyalty
- Increased conversion rates
- Improved customer experience
- Increased customer lifetime value
- Improved Return on investment (ROI).

== Features ==
Personalization management systems typically offer a range of features to manage and deliver personalized messages, campaigns, and experiences.

These features typically include:

- Real-time personalization to automate customer interactions
- Segmentation for creating and managing customer segments based on customer attributes and behavior
- A/B testing for choosing the best-performing content variations
- Recommendations of relevant products and content to customers
- Analytics and reporting to give marketers a deep view of their website or application's performance
- Customer data management for collecting and segmenting customer data to create user profiles and understand customer behaviors

== Deployment ==
Personalization management systems are available as both on-premises and cloud-based solutions. On-premises solutions offer more control and customization. Yet, cloud-based (SaaS) solutions are more common due to their lower costs and ease of management.

== Vendors ==
Some of the key vendors in the personalization management space are Adobe Target, Croct, Twilio, Responsys, and Monetate.

== See also ==
- List of content management systems
- Content management
- Content Management Interface
- Content management system
- Document management system
- Dynamic web page
- Enterprise content management
- Headless content management system
- HTML
- Information management
- Knowledge management
- LAMP (software bundle)
- Personalization
- Revision control
- Web application framework
- Web content management system
