= Ganeti =

Virtual machine cluster management tool

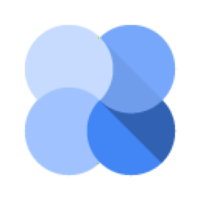
- Original author(s): Google
- Developer(s): Community-supported
- Initial release: August 30, 2007; 17 years ago
- Stable release: 3.0.2 (February 28, 2022; 3 years ago) [±]
- Preview release: 3.0.0-rc1 (September 20, 2020; 4 years ago) [±]
- Repository: github.com/ganeti/ganeti
- Written in: Python, Haskell
- Operating system: Linux
- Platform: Xen, KVM, LXC
- Type: Virtual machine monitor
- License: 2-clause BSD license
- Website: ganeti.org

Ganeti is a virtual machine cluster management tool originally developed by Google. The solution stack uses either Xen, KVM, or LXC as the virtualization platform, LVM for disk management, and optionally DRBD for disk replication across physical hosts or shared storage for external replication. Since 2007 Ganeti is developed and released as free and open-source software. Originally subject to the requirements of the GNU General Public License (GPL) version 2, the license was changed to the 2-clause BSD license in version 2.11.6, released September 2014.

Ganeti acts as a convenient wrapper around existing hypervisors for system administrators to set up a cluster. It is used by Google for some of its computing infrastructure and also by the Linux Foundation (formerly Open Source Development Labs) for hosting open source projects. In contrast to cloud solutions designed for many ephemeral VMs, Ganeti focuses on long-lived, persistent VMs suitable for workloads that don't have built-in redundancy.

The first International Ganeti Conference, Ganeticon 2013 was held in Greece from 3rd till 5 September 2013. The second and third one were held at Portland State University (in Portland, OR, in September 2014), and Google Prague (in Prague, Czech Republic, in September 2015). The fourth conference took place at Google's Dublin office, in September 2016. The fifth conference was held in Leipzig in December 2017 at Spreadshirt.

== See also ==
- Synnefo
- oVirt
- openQRM
- Ceph
- Proxmox
