= Rasmus Lerdorf =

Danish-Canadian programmer and creator of PHP (born 1968)

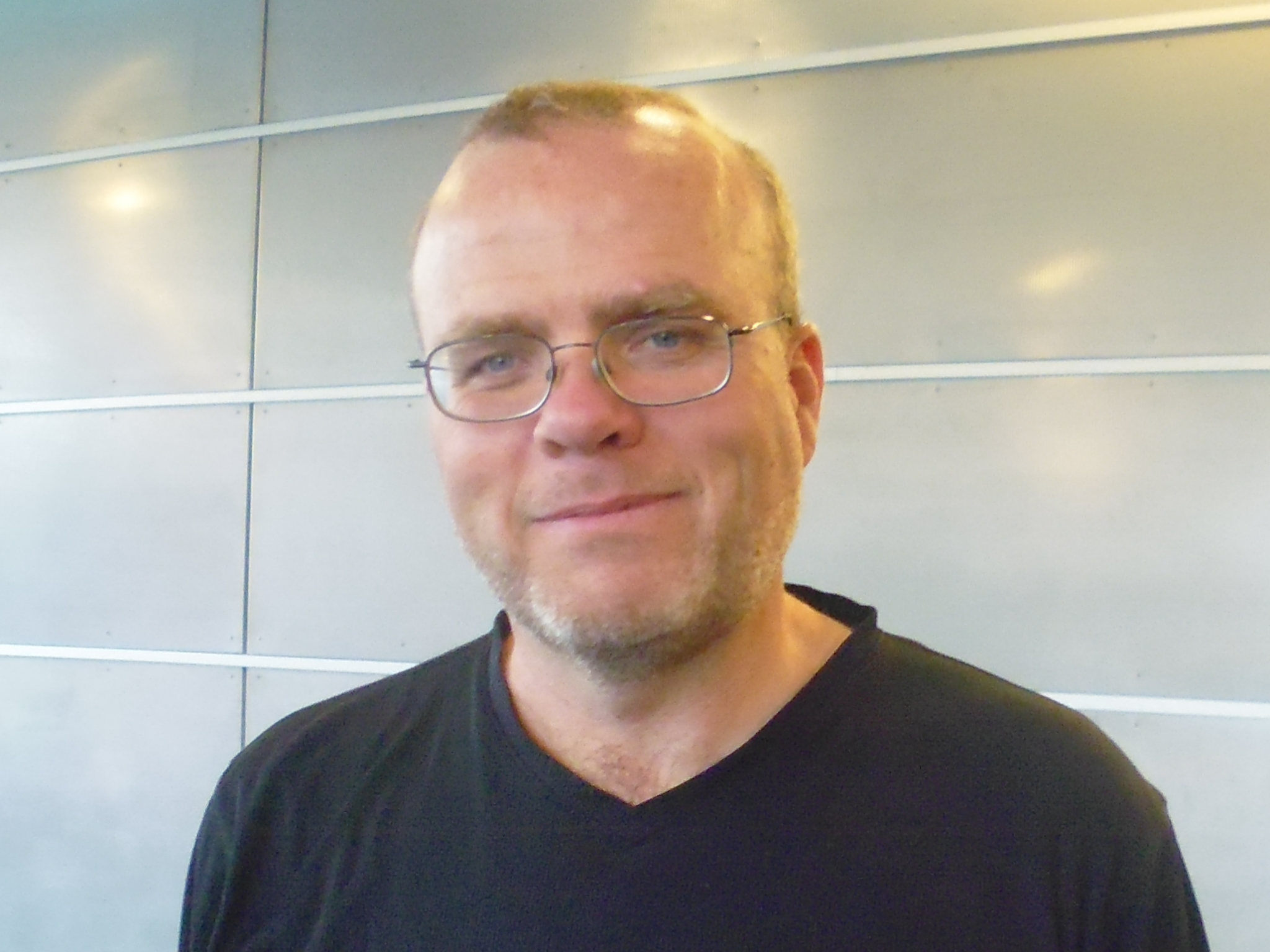
- Lerdorf in 2014
- Born: 22 November 1968 (age 57); Qeqertarsuaq, Greenland
- Citizenship: Danish, Canadian
- Education: University of Waterloo (BAS)
- Occupation: Programmer
- Known for: PHP
- Website: toys.lerdorf.com

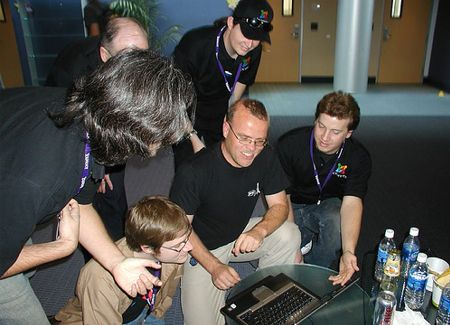
Lerdorf talks about security with Joomla! developers at OSCMS 2007 Conference.

Rasmus Lerdorf (Danish: [ˈleɐ̯ˌtɒˀf]; born 22 November 1968) is a Danish-Canadian programmer. He is best known as the creator of PHP, a general-purpose scripting language, which he created in 1993 and released in 1995. He continues to contribute to the language's development.

== Early life and education ==
Rasmus Lerdorf was born on 22 November 1968 in Qeqertarsuaq, Greenland, and moved to Denmark in his early years. Lerdorf's family moved to Canada from Denmark in 1980, and later moved to King City, Ontario, in 1983.

He graduated from King City Secondary School in 1988, and in 1993 he graduated from the University of Waterloo with a Bachelor of Applied Science in Systems Design Engineering.

== Career ==
Lerdorf contributed to the Apache HTTP Server and he added the LIMIT clause to the mSQL DBMS. A variant of this LIMIT clause had already been around for a decade in mainframe relational database management systems (like Oracle Rdb running on VMS, formerly from Digital Equipment Corporation), but apparently it had not yet been picked up by the emerging PC-based databases. It was later adapted by several other SQL-compatible DBMS. He released the first version of PHP in 1995.

From September 2002 to November 2009 Lerdorf was employed by Yahoo! Inc. as an Infrastructure Architecture Engineer. In 2010, he joined WePay in order to develop their application programming interface. Throughout 2011 he was a roving consultant for startups. On 22 February 2012 he announced on Twitter that he had joined Etsy. In July 2013 Lerdorf joined Jelastic as a senior advisor to help them with the creation of new technology.

Lerdorf is a frequent speaker at Open Source conferences around the world. During his keynote presentation at OSCMS 2007, he presented a security vulnerability in each of the projects represented at the conference that year.

Lerdorf also appeared at the WeAreDevelopers Conferences 2017 and 2019, making a speech on the history of PHP, the new PHP 7 release in 2017, and the 25 years of PHP.

== Award ==
In 2003, Lerdorf was named in the MIT Technology Review TR100 as one of the top 100 innovators in the world under the age of 35.

== See also ==
- List of University of Waterloo people
