= Kate Keahey =

American computer scientist

- Education: Indiana University Bloomington
- Known for: Cloud computing; Experimental testbeds; Reproducibility; Digital publishing
- Awards: Association for Women in Science Innovator Award (2015); The PROSE Award (Professional and Scholarly Excellence) for SoftwareX journal (2015)
- Scientific career
- Fields: Distributed computing; Resource management; Cyberinfrastructure; Reproducibility; High performance computing
- Workplaces: Argonne National Laboratory; Consortium for Advanced Science and Engineering (CASE) of the University of Chicago
- Academic advisors: Dennis Gannon
- Website: www.mcs.anl.gov/~keahey/

Katarzyna Keahey is a Senior Computer Scientist at Argonne National Laboratory and the Consortium for Advanced Science and Engineering (CASE) of the University of Chicago. She is a Principal Investigator (PI) of the Chameleon project, which provides an innovative experimentation platform for computer science systems experiments. She created Nimbus, one of the first open source implementations of infrastructure-as-a-Service (IaaS), and co-founded the SoftwareX journal, publishing software as a scientific instrument.

== Education ==
Keahey attended the Gdańsk University of Technology where she obtained her magister inżynier in informatics in 1992. She received her M.S. in computer science at Indiana University Bloomington in 1994, and later went on to earn her Ph.D. in computer science at Indiana University in 1998. Her Ph.D. dissertation was titled, An Architecture for Application-Level Parallel Distributed Computation, and was supervised by Dennis Gannon.

== Research ==
Her research interests include cloud computing, resource management, in particular the exploration of how cloud and high-performance/scientific resources can co-exist and complement each other, infrastructure operation, and Internet of Things (IoT)/cloud continuum. She is currently developing methods that support capturing, replicating, and publishing experiments digitally.
