= Nimbus (cloud computing) =

Software toolkit

- Developers: Kate Keahey, Tim Freeman, et al.
- Initial release: TP2.2 2009-01-09
- Written in: Java, Python
- Operating system: Linux
- Platform: Xen + KVM
- Type: Cloud computing
- License: Apache License version 2
- Website: www.nimbusproject.org

Nimbus is a toolkit that, once installed on a cluster, provides an infrastructure as a service cloud to its client via WSRF-based or Amazon EC2 WSDL web service APIs. Nimbus is free and open-source software, subject to the requirements of the Apache License, version 2.

Nimbus supports both the hypervisors Xen and KVM and virtual machine schedulers Portable Batch System and Oracle Grid Engine. It allows deployment of self-configured virtual clusters via contextualization. It is configurable with respect to scheduling, networking leases, and usage accounting.

== Requirements ==
- Xen 3.x
- Kernel-based Virtual Machine
- Java 1.5+
- Python (2.4+)
- Linux kernel's Netfilter and ebtables for a bridging firewall
- DHCP server

== See also ==
- Cloud-computing comparison
