= SoftwareX =

- Discipline: Software
- Language: English
- Edited by: Kate Keahey; Randall Sobie; David Wallom

Publication details
- History: 2015-present
- Publisher: Elsevier
- Frequency: Biannually
- Open access: Yes
- License: CC BY/CC BY-NC-ND
- Impact factor: 2.4 (2024)

Standard abbreviations
- ISO 4: SoftwareX

Indexing
- ISSN: 2352-7110
- OCLC no.: 980021721

Links
- Journal homepage; Online access; Online archive

SoftwareX is a biannual peer-reviewed open-access scientific journal covering scientific software. It is published by Elsevier, and its editors-in-chief are Kate Keahey, Randall Sobie, and David Wallom. The journal has an official GitHub repository where the software/code of all publications are archived. Articles are licensed under the Creative Commons Attribution License.

== Abstracting and indexing ==
The journal is abstracted and indexed in the following bibliographic databases:

- Emerging Sources Citation Index
- Inspec
- Scopus
