= OnApp =

Cloud computing platform

OnApp cloud platform
- Developer: OnApp Limited
- Initial release: 2.0 2010-07-19
- Stable release: 6.5 stable
- Platform: Hypervisors (Xen, KVM, VMware, EC2)
- Type: Public and private cloud computing
- Website: https://onapp.com/

OnApp was a London, UK-based software company. Its software enabled service providers to build, operate and sell IaaS public cloud, private cloud and content delivery network services. OnApp also operated the OnApp Federation, a wholesale cloud infrastructure marketplace, which enabled service providers to buy and sell cloud infrastructure managed by OnApp software; and enables enterprises to adopt a hybrid cloud model by combining their on-premises cloud infrastructure with public cloud resources.

OnApp was founded in 2010. On 16 August 2021, OnApp became a division of Virtuozzo.

== List of products ==
- OnApp Cloud enables service providers to manage and sell different types of cloud hosting service. It includes a range of tools for server orchestration and virtual appliance management, and managing associated functions such as metering, monitoring, failover, backups, security, billing, user permissions and limits; plus software-defined networking and software-defined storage capabilities. OnApp Cloud is managed via a graphical user interface which is available for web browsers, iOS and Android devices; or via its REST API
- Cloud.net provides OnApp cloud software and infrastructure as a service
- OnApp CDN enables service providers to create their own content delivery network services
- OnApp Edge Accelerator is a patented, automated content optimization and distribution tool for web applications running on a virtual server in OnApp clouds
- OnApp for VMware Cloud Director enables OnApp to be used as a management, provisioning and billing portal for VMware Cloud Director
- OnApp for VMware vCenter enables OnApp to be used as a management, provisioning and billing portal for VMware vCenter environments
- OnApp Federation is a wholesale marketplace where service providers can buy and sell cloud infrastructure on demand

== Partnerships ==
OnApp partnerships include:

- VMware - OnApp is a VMware Technology Alliance Partner and a recommended VMware portal provider

== Acquisitions ==
On 8 August 2011 OnApp announced the acquisition of Aflexi, a CDN management software company

On 16 September 2014 OnApp announced the acquisition of SolusVM, a virtual server management software company. On 7 June 2018, SolusVM was acquired from OnApp by Plesk

On 16 August 2021, Virtuozzo announced that it had acquired OnApp.
