= Jelastic =

American cloud services provider

- Type: Subsidiary
- Industry: Cloud computing
- Founded: 2011; 15 years ago
- Headquarters: Palo Alto, California, USA
- Area served: Worldwide
- Key people: Ruslan Synytsky (CEO)
- Services: PaaS, Cloud Hosting, Private Cloud, Public Cloud, Hybrid Cloud, Multicloud, Kubernetes, Docker (software)
- Parent: Virtuozzo
- Website: www.virtuozzo.com

Jelastic is a cloud platform software vendor that provides multi-cloud platform as a service-based on container technology for hosting service providers, ISVs, telecommunication companies, enterprises and developers. The platform is available as public cloud in over 70 data centers, as well as virtual and on-premises servers. Jelastic provides support of Java, PHP, Ruby, Node.js, Python, Go environments, custom Docker containers and Kubernetes clusters.

Jelastic was co-founded by Ruslan Synytsky, who also was CEO. Jelastic was acquired by Virtuozzo in 2021.

== History ==
Jelastic was founded in 2011 as a public cloud company. Initially, it was a Platform as a Service specifically targeted on Java hosting. In 2012, the company received the Java Duke Choice Award.

From 2013 to 2015, the platform added support for PHP, Ruby, Python, Node.js, .NET and support of Docker containers. The latest runtime addition was in 2017 by integrating GoLang. In 2014, a private cloud solution was introduced, and by 2015, the platform could be used as a hybrid and multi-cloud service.

Jelastic closed a set of funding rounds from Runa Capital, Almaz Capital Partners, Foresight Ventures and Maxfield Capital.

In June 2013, Jelastic announced the hiring of Mark Zbikowski, a former Microsoft architect and contributor to MS-DOS, as a senior adviser. In July 2013, Rasmus Lerdorf, creator of PHP, joined Jelastic as a senior adviser.

In November 2014, the creators of the Java programming language James Gosling and Bruno Souza joined the Jelastic team.

In 2018, Jelastic received Duke's Choice Award for the second time.

In 2021, Virtuozzo acquired Jelastic technology and business to offer First Full-Stack Cloud Management Solution for Service Providers. The acquisition comes after a 10-year partnership between the two companies.

== Services ==
=== Supported technologies ===
- Languages: Java, PHP, Ruby, Node.js, Python, .NET, Go
- Virtualization: Docker, Virtuozzo
- Load balancers: nginx, Apache, HAProxy, Varnish, LiteSpeed
- Application Servers: Tomcat, LiteSpeed, GlassFish, Jetty, Payara, Apache, nginx PHP, nginx Ruby, SmartFoxServer, Railo, Spring Boot, TomEE, WildFly, JBoss
- Databases: MySQL, MariaDB, Percona, PostgreSQL, Redis, Neo4j, MongoDB, Apache Cassandra, CouchDB, OrientDB
- VPS: CentOS, Ubuntu, Windows VPS
- Additional: Maven, Memcached, Storage
- Integrated IDEs: IntelliJ IDEA, Eclipse, NetBeans
