= OpenQRM =

Free and open-source cloud computing management platform

openQRM
- Developer: OPENQRM AUSTRALIA PTY LTD
- Initial release: 2004
- Stable release: 5.3.60 / 22 August 2024; 16 months ago
- Written in: PHP, C, Shell script
- Operating system: Linux
- Platform: Hypervisors (Xen, KVM, VMware ESXi) and other solutions (Linux-VServer, VirtualBox, OpenVZ)
- Available in: English
- Type: Cloud computing
- License: Community (GNU GPL v2)/Commercial
- Website: openqrm-enterprise.com

openQRM is a free and open-source cloud-computing management platform for managing heterogeneous data centre infrastructures.

Provides an Automated Workflow Engine for all Bare-Metal and VM deployment, as well as for all IT subsystems, enabling professional management and monitoring of your data centre & cloud capacities.

The openQRM platform manages a data centre's infrastructure to build private, public and hybrid infrastructure as a service clouds. openQRM orchestrates storage, network, virtualisation, monitoring, and security implementations technologies to deploy multi-tier services (e.g. compute clusters) as virtual machines on distributed infrastructures, combining both data centre resources and remote cloud resources, according to allocation policies.

The openQRM platform emphasises a separation of hardware (physical servers and virtual machines) from software (operating system server-images). Hardware is treated agnostically as a computing resource that should be replaceable without the need to reconfigure the software.

Supported virtualisation solutions include KVM, Linux-VServer, OpenVZ, VMware ESXi, Hyper-V and Xen. Virtual machines of these types are managed transparently via openQRM.

P2V (physical to virtual), V2P (virtual to physical), and V2V (virtual to virtual) migration are possible as well as transitioning from one virtualisation technology to another with the same VM.

openQRM is developed and distributed by OPENQRM AUSTRALIA PTY LTD, a company located in New South Wales, Australia. The openQRM Enterprise Edition is the commercially backed, extended product for professional users offering reliable support options and access to additional features. Users combine the services required. Simply integrate additional technologies and services through a large variety of plug-ins to exactly fit the use-case (OpenvSwitch, KVM, ESXi, OpenStack, AWS EC2, MS Azure, etc.). Over 50 plug-ins are available for openQRM Enterprise.

== Plug-Ins ==
openQRM utilises plug-ins to customise its functionality. These plug-ins allow for increased integration and compatibility.

Their plug-in library is ever-expanding and falls into the categories; Cloud, Container, Deployment, Documentation, High-Availability, Management, Miscellaneous, Monitoring, Network, Storage and Virtualisation.

== History ==
openQRM was initially released by the Qlusters company and went open-source in 2006. Qlusters ceased operations, while openQRM was left in the hands of the openQRM community. In November 2008, the openQRM community released version 4.0 which included a complete port of the platform from Java to PHP/C/Perl/Shell.

In 2020, openQRM Enterprise GmbH had its assets ad intellectual property acquired by Fiveways International Ltd, who appointed OPENQRM AUSTRALIA PTY LTD as the master distributor.

== See also ==
- Cloud computing
- Cloud-computing comparison
- Cloud infrastructure
