= Safe Swiss Cloud =

Swiss cloud and security company

- Industry: Artificial Intelligence, Cloud Computing, Managed IT Services
- Founded: 2013
- Headquarters: Zürich, Switzerland
- Area served: Worldwide
- Key people: Prodosh Banerjee (Founder/CEO); Gerald Dürr (Founder / Business Development); David Poole (CTO); Tasos Lolotsis (Head of Operations)
- Services: Private AI; Managed IT Services; Cloud Computing; Application Hosting
- Website: safeswisscloud.com

Safe Swiss Cloud is a Swiss-based company providing sovereign Private AI, Managed IT Services, Cloud Computing and Application Hosting. It offers compliance with the requirements of privacy sensitive industries like healthcare and financial services.

== History ==
The company was founded in 2013 by Prodosh Banerjee and Gerald Dürr.

In 2015, cloud services expanded to several data centres, while investing in equipment to increase capacity.

In 2017, Safe Swiss Cloud added a number of new platforms to its offerings, including Kubernetes & Openshift, Openstack and VMware/vCloud. An investment has been made to expand clustered and redundant solid-state drive (SSD) storage capacity.

In 2025 Safe Swiss Cloud has introduced privateAI services.

== Services ==
As of 2025 Safe Swiss Cloud comprises services in the areas of computing, SSD storage, networking, Openshift/Kubernetes, database, application services, deployment, systems management, AI and tools for the Internet of Things.

The services are available in self service mode or as managed services and offer APIs for provisioning computing resources in Openshift and OpenStack. The Private AI services can be accessed via interactive chat clients or Open API calls.

== Acquisitions ==
In August 2015, Safe Swiss Cloud acquired Basel based Nexos, an IT services company.

In late 2017, Everyware AG, a Swiss IT services company, acquired a controlling stake in Safe Swiss Cloud.

== Awards ==
In November 2015, the company was announced as a winner of the "Bully Awards" issued to European organizations that stand out through innovation, leadership and exceptional growth.

In December 2015, Safe Swiss Cloud was named best practice for finance applications in the Cloud by the European Union Agency for Network and Information Security (ENISA) in the report "Secure Use of Cloud Computing in the Finance Sector".

== Research ==
Safe Swiss Cloud collaborated with the Zurich University of Applied Sciences/ZHAW to research cyber intelligence and advanced cloud billing systems. This research was supported by CTI, the Swiss government's research and innovation program for industry.
