= Fluid Operations =

Company in Walldorf, Germany

fluid Operations AG
- Type: Aktiengesellschaft
- Industry: Cloud Computing, Semantic technology
- Founded: 2008
- Headquarters: Walldorf, Germany
- Products: eCloudManager, Information Workbench
- Website: www.fluidops.com

fluid Operations AG (fluidOps) was a German software company founded in 2008. It specialized in cloud management and semantic technology. Fluid Operations' product portfolio included the semantic integration platform Information Workbench and eCloudManager. Additionally, Fluid Operations offered an open source software, the VMFS Driver. In 2018 fluidOps was acquired by Veritas Technologies.

== Research Projects ==
fluidOps was part of these research projects:

- NewProt: Development of an interactive Self-Service Portal for protein engineering software and databases. This project is funded by the European Union and started in 2011.
- Optique: Development of a scalable end user access to big data. The project is funded by the Seventh Framework Programme of the EU. Project partners are: the University of Oslo, the University of Oxford, the Hamburg University of Technology, the National and Kapodistrian University of Athens, the Sapienza University of Rome and the Free University of Bozen-Bolzano, as well as the companies Siemens and Statoil.
- CORA – abbreviation for Cloud Orchestration Appliance: Development of a planning and control system for the provisioning and operation of cloud-based data centers. The project is funded by Federal Ministry of Economics and Technology and project partners are NetApp, Bielefeld University and Christmann Informationstechnik + Medien.
- StratusCloud: Integration of virtualized data sources in the cloud. Mainly service providers and service customers will benefit of the data analysis in enterprise networks. Collaboration partners are: the DHBW Mannheim, DHBW Mosbach and the company Harms&Wende.
- Durchblick: Development of a mobile conference assistance system for augmented reality devices such as Google Glass which will be based on the Conference Explorer. The project is funded by the Federal Ministry of Economics and Technology and the project partner is the University of Freiburg.
- EUCLID abbreviation for Educational Curriculum for the usage of Linked Data: Development, Implementation and Dissemination of linked data learning material and activities for data practitioners who used to work with Linked data. fluidOps develops a community portal based on the Information Workbench. Funded by the 7th Framework Programme of the European Union the project runs for 24 months and started in May 2012. Project partners are KIT, the Open University STI Research, Universidad Simon Bolivar, University of Southampton and Ontotext.

== Open Source Projects ==
- VMFSDriver: It enables read-only access to files and folders on partitions formatted in the Virtual Machine File System (VMFS) by VMware.
- FedX: Practical framework for transparent access to Linked Data sources through a federation.
- Enterprise Cloud Ontology: OWL Ontology which represents the basic concepts that are mainly used in the area of enterprise cloud management.
- Information Workbench Community Edition: Freely available version of the Information Workbench which has been published under an Open Source License and has a limited set of capabilities.
- OSLC Membership: Support of the Open Source Community with the development of standards.

== Awards ==
- fluid Operations AG: Gartner Cool Vendor in the SAP Ecosystem Report 2010
- Information Workbench Conference Explorer: Linked Data-a-Thon 2011 at the ISWC. 2nd Place at the WWW Metadata Challenge 2012.
- fluid Operations AG: Winner of the Computerwoche Best in Cloud Award 2012 in the category Infrastructure as a Service - Private Cloud
- fluid Operations AG and KIVBF, a communal IT service provider in southern Germany: Winner of the Computerwoche Best in Cloud Innovation Award 2015
- fluid Operations AG become Leader 2018 for Hybrid Cloud Management & Orchestration in the study "ISG Provider Lens – Germany 2018"
