= Atlantic.net =

Atlantic.Net
- Industry: Information Technology Services
- Founded: 1994, Gainesville, Florida
- Founder: Manoj "Marty" Puranik; Jose Sanchez
- Headquarters: Orlando, Florida, United States
- Area served: United States
- Key people: Manoj Puranik (CEO)
- Services: cloud computing hipaa compliant hosting dedicated hosting vps hosting internet service provider internet hosting service
- Website: www.atlantic.net

Atlantic.Net is an American cloud computing and hosting services provider with data center presence in the United States. Founded in 1994 in Gainesville, Florida as the Internet Connect Company Computers (ICC Computers), it is headquartered in Orlando. As of 2012, the company states that it provides colocation, cloud server hosting internationally as a cloud service provider, dedicated servers and managed server hosting.

== History ==
=== Founding ===
Atlantic.net was founded in 1994 by Manoj "Marty" Puranik and Jose Sanchez, then both students at the University of Florida in Gainesville. Since the university did not allow all students web access at that time, Puranik and Sanchez created the infrastructure to be an internet service provider so they could get online themselves. The first connection was paid for by a computer repair shop run out of Puranik's dorm room.

The company was first named Internet Connect Company Computers (ICC Computers), and within a year had eight employees serving 2,000 customers in the Gainesville area. In 1995, it launched its first commercial internet services, and expanded services to Tampa and Orlando in 1996.

=== Growth ===
By 1997, the company was expanding, acquiring First Coast Internet and Worldwide Internet, and adopting the name Atlantic.Net for its internet division. That year, its internet service became available in Jacksonville and the Space Coast, and ICC hosted the website of WRRX. Near the end of 1997, the company was officially renamed Atlantic.Net, and launched services to nine more cities.

By 1998, it had doubled its revenue and acquired three further internet service providers (ISPs). The company created a web division in 1999, completed its tenth acquisition, and expanded to Mississippi and Louisiana. It was then recognized as the 15th fastest growing private company in Florida, and was nominated for the 1999 Florida 100. Also in 1999, the company introduced webmail and became CLEC certified.

In 2000, the company launched service in Georgia and Alabama. The next year, it went national with dial-up service, began offering DSL, and also introduced "true private networks". At this point, the company was still completely self-financed, and in 2001 brought in profits of over $10 million and had 50,000 subscribers. By 2002, Atlantic.Net had acquired 13 other internet service companies.

In 2002, it opened new headquarters in Orlando, Florida, and became the first ISP in Orlando offering high speed dial-up. That year, it also started nationwide long-distance service for businesses, completed its 16th acquisition, and began working with ClearChannel Broadcasting. By early 2002, it served Alabama, Florida, Georgia, Louisiana, Mississippi, and the Carolinas. The company also bought a 25,000 square feet (2,300 m^{2}) data center in Orlando in 2003, and began working with the AAA. In 2005, Atlantic.Net expanded data center services to cover VoIP systems.

=== Recent years ===
In 2009, Atlantic.Net completed SAS 70 certification, and also took on the Orlando Magic as a client. That year, it launched managed hosting services for international government agencies and businesses. It introduced cloud computing in 2010, and in 2011 started offering methods for organizations to outsource IT infrastructure. That year, the company expanded across the United States and added cloud computing API. The company completed SSAE 16 Type II certification (formerly SAS 70) in 2012.

== Honors ==
- 1999 – CEO Puranik named to board of directors of the Florida Internet Service Providers Association
- 1999 – Puranik named a finalist for the Ernst & Young "Entrepreneur of the Year" award
- 1999-2002 – member of the Florida Council of 100
- 2000-2002 – one of Inc. Magazine’s "500 Fastest-Growing Private Companies in America"
- 2003 – Puranik named as a finalist for the American Business Award for "Best Executive"
- 2009 – Puranik named one of the "Top 40 under 40" by The Business Journal, which also named the company as the largest independent ISP in its region
