= Jeni Tennison =

British software engineer (born 1972)

Jeni Tennison OBE
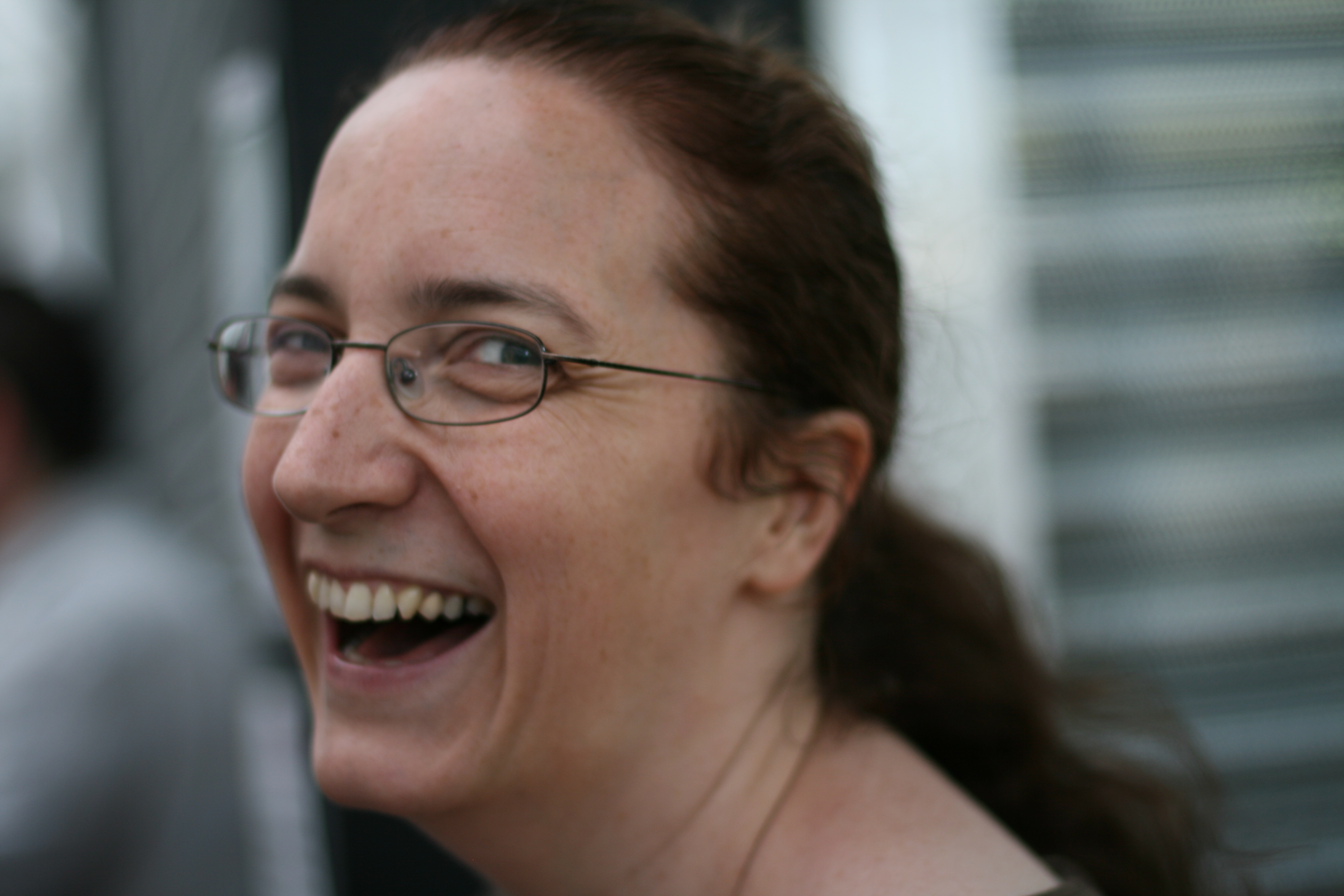
- Tennison in 2009, picture by Paul Downey
- Born: Jenifer Fays Alys Tennison; May 1972 (age 54); Cambridge, England
- Education: University of Nottingham (BSc, PhD)
- Scientific career
- Known for: data.gov.uk legislation.gov.uk
- Fields: Open data; Linked data; Public policy; Data governance
- Workplaces: gov.uk; Open Data Institute; Open Knowledge Foundation; The Stationery Office; World Wide Web Consortium; Creative Commons; School of Advanced Study; University of London
- Thesis: Living ontologies : collaborative knowledge structuring on the Internet (1999)
- Doctoral advisor: Nigel Shadbolt
- Tennison's voice recorded November 2014
- Website: www.jenitennison.com

Jenifer Fays Alys Tennison OBE (born 1972) is a British software engineer and consultant who co-chairs the data governance working group within the Global Partnership on Artificial Intelligence (GPAI). She also serves on the board of directors of Creative Commons, the Global Partnership for Sustainable Development Data (GPSDD) and the information law and policy centre of the School of Advanced Study (SAS) at the University of London. She was previously Chief Executive Officer (CEO) of the Open Data Institute (ODI).

== Education ==
Tennison was born in Cambridge, England and educated at the University of Nottingham gaining a Bachelor of Science degree in Psychology in 1994 and a PhD in collaborative ontology development in 1999, supervised by Nigel Shadbolt.

== Career ==
Tennison has been the technical architect and lead developer for legislation.gov.uk and previously worked on the linked data aspects of data.gov.uk. Previously, she was self-employed as a consultant.

Tennison has authored or co-authored papers on XSLT, XML, structured data and knowledge bases. She has authored books including Beginning XSLT, Beginning XSLT 2.0, XSLT and XPath on the Edge and Professional XML Schemas. Tennison was an invited expert on the XSL and XML processing working groups at the World Wide Web Consortium (W3C) and was appointed to the W3C's Technical Architecture Group (TAG) in 2011. She has previously worked for the Open Knowledge Foundation and Epistemics Ltd.

Tennison is the co-creator of the open data board game Datopolis.

Tennison founded Connected by Data (incorporated in February 2022) and leads a team with the mission of "we want communities to have a powerful say in decisions about data so that it is used to create a just, equitable and sustainable world".

=== Awards and honours ===
Tennison was appointed Officer of the Most Excellent Order of the British Empire (OBE) in the 2014 New Year Honours for services to Technology and Open Data.
