= XRX (web application architecture) =

In software development, XRX is a web application architecture based on XForms, REST and XQuery. XRX applications store data on both the web client and on the web server in XML format and do not require a translation between data formats. XRX is notable for its simple and streamlined application architecture due to the minimal number of translations needed to transport data between client and server systems. The XRX architecture is also tightly coupled to W3C standards (CSS, XHTML 2.0, XPath, XML Schema) to ensure XRX applications will be robust in the future. Because XRX applications leverage modern declarative languages on the client and functional languages on the server they are designed to empower non-developers who are not familiar with traditional imperative languages such as JavaScript, Java or .Net.

== Overview of XRX ==
XRX is a zero translation application architecture that uses XML to store data in the client web browser, on the application server and in the database server. It is because each of these layers uses XML as the same structural data model that XRX applications do not have to translate data structures to and from both object and relational data structures. Because of the lack of need for translation, XRX is considered to have a clean and elegant design. The XRX web application architecture allows developers to focus on the business problem and not the translation problem. XRX benefits from several advances in software technology:

=== Client Architectural Features ===
- A model–view–controller (MVC) architecture that separates the data from its presentation and business logic.
- A single element (xf:submission) for all server submissions. This replaces much of the JavaScript code required in most AJAX applications.
- An advanced event model (XML Events) consistent with W3C standards that frees applications from having to deal with vendor-specific and browser-specific event handling.
- A Dependency graph that is used to store the dependency structure of the client controllers. This frees the developer from having to manually update either the model or the views when data changes in an application. This allows spreadsheet-like applications to be created on the client with very little effort.
- A declarative programming style that allows most client XForms applications to be created using a small set of approximately 20 elements. This allows rich client applications to be created without knowledge of JavaScript or other procedural scripting languages.
- An easy-to-extend system for creating new user interface controls using the EXtensible Bindings Language. This allows developers to add new controls at any time without fear of incompatibilities with W3C standards.

=== Server Architecture Features ===
- Many native XML databases have built-in REST interfaces making each XQuery inherently a RESTful web service.
- A functional programming model that promotes side-effect free systems that are easier to debug and easier to run on multiple processors.
- An easy-to-extend system using XQuery function and modules.

=== Both Client and Server ===
- Both XRX client and server components support a wide range of XML related standards such as XPath, XML Schema and XML Namespaces.
- Consistent use of REST interfaces to exchange data between the client and server for all transfers of data including as-you-type data checking and suggest functions.
- Consistent integration of W3C standards including use of XPath and XML Schema data types.
- A large library of standard of functions used on both the client and server.

== Overall Benefits of XRX ==
One of the principal benefits of the XRX architecture is that it avoids the requirement to "shred" complex data structures into relational structures and then reconstitute the data back into structures when a record is edited on the client.

Another benefits of the XRX Web application architecture is that it avoids most of the problems around the object-relational impedance mismatch.

Another advantage is that the client developer does not have to learn JavaScript on the client.

== Comparison with Traditional Object/Relational Web Application Architectures ==
Many traditional web application architectures created in the late 1990 were based on middle object tiers and persistence layers that used tabular data streams and relational database systems. Because each of these layers used different structures to store the models the systems required much additional complexity to translate between layers.

== History of XRX ==
Early examples of using a zero-translation architecture in multi-tier systems can be traced back to the rise of object-oriented databases in the 1990s. See ODBMS history.

Mark Birbeck suggested that the combination of XForms, XQuery with REST interfaces between the two had many advantages in a meeting to the UK XML User Group in September 2006. His presentation was one of the first to specifically suggest that the combination of three technologies: XForms and XQuery with REST interfaces would have surprisingly beneficial effects. Mark termed this process "Skimming" but that term did not seem to be contagious.

Erik Bruchez of Orbeon spoke at the XML 2007 conference on Boston in December 2007. In his presentation "XForms and the eXist XML database: a perfect couple", Bruchez showed that many people were discovering synergistic benefits of XForms on the client and XQuery on the server.

The label for XRX was suggested by a blog posting by Dan McCreary on December 14, 2007. It was in this article that Dan suggested the need for a contagious meme for the ideas behind the XRX architecture.

== Generalizations of XRX ==
Although XRX was originally intended to connote the use of XForms on the client, REST as an interface and XQuery on the server, other proponents of the symmetrical use of XML on the client and server have generalized the term to encompass any XML-centric web client and any server that can store and query XML documents. This use of XRX is generally referred to as "shallow XRX". These generalizations do benefit from a simplified zero-translation architecture but many do not benefit from REST interfaces, XPath for consistent data selection, declarative systems in the client, and functional languages on the server (one of the key aspects of XRX). Use of all three technologies (XForms, REST and XQuery) is referred to as "deep XRX".

Although XRX architecture is centred on XForms and XQuery, it does not preclude the use of other technologies that manipulate XML natively, such as XSLT, XProc, and XSL-FO.

== See also ==
- Web application framework

== Additional Resource ==
- XRX: Simple, Elegant, Disruptive by Dan McCreary
- Google Code repository for XRX developers
- Metaphorical Web and XRX by Kurt Cagle
- XRX Queries using the eXist database by Jeni Tennison
- XRX Mapping URLS with Orbeon Forms by Jeni Tennison
- XRX Performing Updates by Jeni Tennison
- XRX Locking Grain Design by Dan McCreary
- XRX Wikibook XRX Wikibook with tutorials for creating CRUDS application using the eXist database
- The Agile Stack by Jason Monberg
- Jesse Alama's Blog on XQuery and XRX
