= Content Management Interface =

Content Management Interface (CMI) in computer software is an Open Mobile Alliance enabler that provides a standardized way for content providers to interact with service providers (network operators).

CMI is an interface between content providers and service providers, which does not directly involve the end user. The scope of the standard covers the entire off-deck content management lifecycle but does not include implementation or behavior beyond the API. Therefore, it can accommodate a broad range of services and service policies.

CMI 1.0 was publicly released on July 5th, 2011.
