= XForms =

XML format to create Web forms

XForms is an XML format used for collecting inputs from web forms. XForms was designed to be the next generation of HTML / XHTML forms, but is generic enough that it can also be used in a standalone manner or with presentation languages other than XHTML to describe a user interface and a set of common data manipulation tasks.

XForms 1.0 (Third Edition) was published on 29 October 2007. The original XForms specification became an official W3C Recommendation on 14 October 2003, while XForms 1.1, which introduced a number of improvements, reached the same status on 20 October 2009.

== Differences from web forms ==
In contrast to the original web forms (originally defined in HTML), the creators of XForms used a model–view–controller (MVC) approach. The model consists of one or more XForms models describing form data, constraints upon that data, and submissions. The view describes what controls appear in the form, how they are grouped together, and what data they are bound to. CSS can be used to describe a form's appearance.

An XForms document can be as simple as a web form (by only specifying the submission element in the model section, and placing the controls in the body), but XForms includes many advanced features. For example, new data can be requested and used to update the form while it is running, much like using XMLHttpRequest/AJAX except without scripting. The form author can validate user data against XML Schema data types, require certain data, disable input controls or change sections of the form depending on circumstances, enforce particular relationships between data, input variable length arrays of data, output calculated values derived from form data, prefill entries using an XML document, respond to actions in real time (versus at submission time), and modify the style of each control depending on the device they are displayed on (desktop browser versus mobile versus text only, etc.). There is often no need for any scripting with languages such as JavaScript. However, XForms does include an event model and actions for implementing more complex form behaviors. Actions and event handling are specified using the XForms XML dialect rather than more common scripting languages like JavaScript.

Like web forms, XForms can use various non-XML submission protocols (multipart/form-data, application/x-www-form-urlencoded), but a new feature is that XForms can send data to a server in XML format. XML documents can also be used to prefill data in the form. Because XML is a standard, many tools exist that can parse and modify data upon submission. Similar tools for legacy forms also exist. XForms is itself an XML dialect, and therefore can create and be created from other XML documents using XSLT. Using transformations, XForms can be automatically created from XML schemas, and XForms can be converted to XHTML forms.

== Software support ==
At the time of this writing, no widely used web browser supports XForms natively. However, various browser plugins, client-side extensions and server/client solutions exist. The following lists some implementations:

- The Firefox XForms extension was part of the Mozilla Project. XForms 1.0 SE support is not complete but covers most of the specification with a notable exception of attribute-based repeating used in HTML tables. The extension was available for both Firefox 2 and Firefox 3, but is not upgraded to support Firefox 4 and higher. In July 2011 the lead developer wrote that XForms support would no longer get updated. Support for XForms was eventually deprecated in Firefox 19.
- IBM Lotus Forms supports development and deployment of XForms-based pure XML forms. Trial downloads are available of an Eclipse-based visual design environment and a client-side viewer that can run XForms-based forms both in the web browser and as a standalone desktop application.
- OpenOffice.org versions 2.0 and greater and LibreOffice support XForms.

== Implementation technologies compared ==
FormFaces, AJAXForms, XSLTForms, betterFORM, Chiba, Orbeon and Smartsite Forms are based on Ajax technology. The amount of server-side and client-side processing varies between these implementations. For example, Ubiquity XForms, FormFaces and XSLTForms provide 100% XForms client-side processing and data model updates via pure Ajax processing on the XForms standard. The others use server-side Java/.NET XForms processing transcoding to Ajax markup prior to delivering the content to the browser. Both techniques can work across browsers. Each implementation is significantly different with respect to dependencies, scalability, performance, licensing, maturity, network traffic, offline capability, and cross browser compatibility. System architects should evaluate these constraints against their needs to determine potential risks and objectives.

Plugins like FormsPlayer and other client-side technology can have some benefits as well: because they integrate themselves into the browser, they will work with existing server architectures, can be more responsive, and require fewer server fetches.

The tradeoff between server-side and client plug-in solutions is where the software is maintained; either each client must install the required plug-in, or the server architecture must change to accommodate the XForms transcoder engine language technology. It is in theory possible to mix both of these solutions, for instance testing the browser for a client-side XForms implementation and serving native XForms in that case, and defaulting to a server solution in other cases.

Ubiquity XForms, FormFaces and XSLTForms provide a "zero software" solution on either the client or server: no new software needs to be installed on the client and the solution can be used in conjunction with any server-side architecture. This is possible because FormFaces and Ubiquity XForms are written 100% in Ajax and because XSLTForms is written in XSLT and in Ajax. The tradeoff is that compared to other solutions, more code is initially downloaded to the client (code can be cached on the client), and FormFaces does not yet support XML Schema validation. Furthermore, XForms submissions with replace "all" behaviour will typically not result in true page replacements and therefore break the normal back button behaviour.

== XRX application architecture ==
Because XForms makes it easy to edit complex XML data there are many advantages to using XForms with native XML databases that frequently leverage REST interfaces. The combination of three technologies (XForms on the client, REST interfaces and XQuery on the server) is collectively known as XRX application development. XRX is known for its simple architecture that uses XML both on the client and in the database and avoids the transformations to object or relational data structures. See "XRX:Simple, Elegant, Disruptive".

== XForms for mobile devices ==
=== Benefits ===
XForms provides specific benefits when used on mobile devices:

- User interfaces using XForms require fewer round trips with the server and are in that sense more self-contained than user interfaces using HTML 4 forms.
- Capabilities of mobile devices vary greatly; consequently the amount of the work involved in generating different user interfaces for different devices is of particular concern in the mobile world. XForms has been designed from the ground up to allow forms to be described independently of the device, which reduces the amount of work required to target multiple devices.
- XForms reduces the need for JavaScript, which is particularly interesting as JavaScript support varies greatly on mobile devices and cannot be widely relied upon. This also allows systems on which JavaScript is disabled for security concerns to continue to operate flawlessly.

=== Implementations ===
==== ODK ====
ODK is an open-source mobile data collection platform that uses a subset of W3C XForms 1.0 called ODK XForms. ODK provides ODK XForms processing libraries in Java (JavaRosa) and JavaScript (enketo-core).

==== Xfolite ====
Xfolite is an inactive light-weight XForms client for the J2ME platform. It was originally created at Nokia Research Center, and it includes a DOM and XPath 1.0 implementation as well as an XForms engine that implements the XForms 1.1 specification almost completely. XFolite was released as beta software and should not be considered ready for production use as such. However, it does contain a mature XForms engine that has been designed to work with different UI implementations. XML Schemas and CSS are outside project scope, however. Xfolite is open source and licensed under the LGPL license, but is not being actively dev

== See also ==
- InfoPath Forms Services
- FormFaces
