= Yaws (web server) =

HTTP web server software

- Developer: Claes Wikström
- Stable release: 2.3.1 / 29 May 2026; 3 months ago
- Written in: Erlang
- Operating system: Cross-platform
- Type: Web server
- License: BSD-3-Clause
- Website: erlyaws.github.io
- Repository: github.com/erlyaws/yaws

The LYME and LYCE software bundles are based on Erlang and comprise Yaws. They are composed entirely of free and open-source software

Yaws (Yet another web server) is a web server written in Erlang by Claes (klacke) Wikström. Yaws can be embedded into other Erlang-based applications or run as a regular standalone web server.

== Overview ==
Because Yaws uses Erlang's lightweight threading system, it performs well under high concurrency. A load test conducted in 2002 comparing Yaws and Apache found that with the hardware tested, Apache failed at 4,000 concurrent connections, while Yaws continued functioning with over 80,000 concurrent connections.

The load test concludes,

"The problem with Apache is not related to the Apache code per se but is due to the manner in which the underlying operating system (Linux) implements concurrency. We believe that any system implemented using operating system threads and processes would exhibit similar performance. Erlang does not make use of the underlying OS's threads and processes for managing its own process pool and thus does not suffer from these limitations".

and in the underlined part above (formatting added), expresses the opinion that the founding technologies make the difference in scalability.

== See also ==
- Comparison of web servers
- LYME (software bundle)
