= LAMP (software bundle) =

Acronym for a common web hosting solution

A high-level overview of LAMP's building blocks and overall system environment

A LAMP (Linux, Apache, MySQL, Perl/PHP/Python) is one of the most common software stacks for the web's most popular applications. Its generic software stack model has largely interchangeable components.

Each letter in the acronym stands for one of its four open-source building blocks

- Linux for the operating system
- Apache HTTP Server
- MariaDB or MySQL for the relational database management system
- Perl, PHP, or Python for the programming language

The components of the LAMP stack are present in the software repositories of most Linux distributions.

== History ==
The acronym LAMP was coined by Michael Kunze in the December 1998 issue of Computertechnik, a German computing magazine, as he demonstrated that a bundle of free and open-source software "could be a feasible alternative to expensive commercial packages". Since then, O'Reilly Media and MySQL teamed up to popularize the acronym and evangelize its use. One of the first open-source software stacks for the web, the term and the concept became popular. The stack is capable of hosting a variety of web frameworks and applications, such as WordPress and Drupal.

== Software components ==
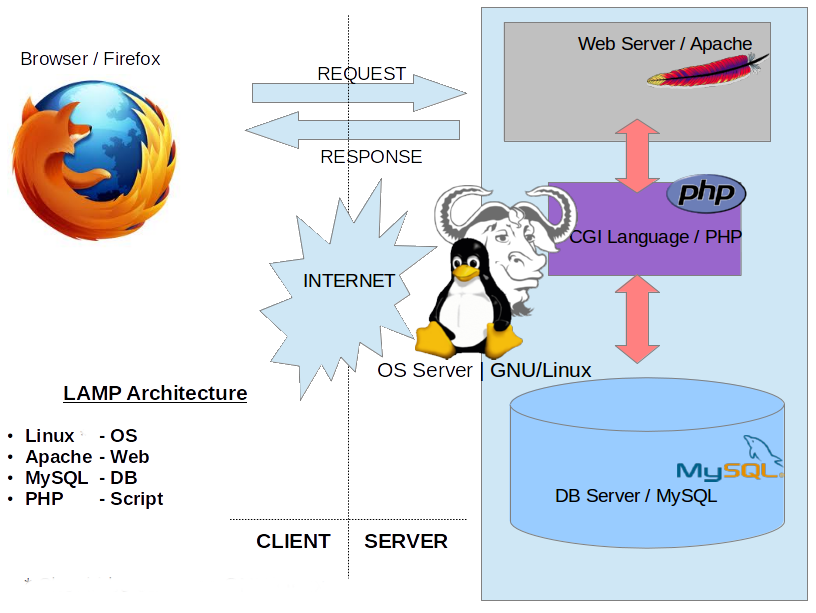
A high-level overview of LAMP's determining components (Firefox serves just as a browser example.)

=== Linux ===
Linux is a Unix-like computer operating system assembled under the model of free and open-source software development and distribution. Most Linux distributions, as collections of software based around the Linux kernel, typically provided through a package management system, provide complete LAMP setups through their packages. According to W3Techs in October 2013, 58.5% of web server market share is shared between Debian and Ubuntu, while RHEL, Fedora and CentOS together shared 37.3%.

=== Apache ===
The role of LAMP's web server has been traditionally supplied by Apache, and has since included other web servers such as nginx.

Apache is developed and maintained by an open community of developers under the auspices of the Apache Software Foundation. Released under the Apache License, Apache is open-source software. A wide variety of features are supported, and many of them are implemented as compiled modules which extend the core functionality of Apache. These can range from server-side programming language support to authentication.

=== MySQL and database alternatives ===
MySQL's original role as the LAMP's relational database management system has since been alternately provisioned by others like PostgreSQL, MariaDB (a community-developed fork of MySQL developed by its original developers), and even NoSQL databases like MongoDB.

MySQL is a multithreaded, multi-user, SQL database management system, acquired by Sun Microsystems in 2008, which was then acquired by Oracle Corporation in 2010. Since its early years, the MySQL team has made its source code available under the terms of the GNU General Public License, as well as under a variety of proprietary agreements.

PostgreSQL is also an ACID-compliant object-relational database management system developed by PostgreSQL Global Development Group.

MongoDB is a NoSQL database that eschews the traditional relational database structure in favor of JSON-like documents with dynamic schemas (calling the format BSON), making the integration of data in certain types of applications easier and faster.

=== PHP and alternatives ===
PHP's role as the LAMP's application programming language has also been performed by other languages such as Perl and Python.

PHP is a server-side scripting language designed for web development but also used as a general-purpose programming language. PHP code is interpreted by a web server via a PHP processor module, which generates the resulting web page. PHP commands can optionally be embedded directly into an HTML source document rather than calling an external file to process data. It has also evolved to include a command-line interface capability and can be used in standalone graphical applications. PHP is free software released under the terms of PHP License, which is incompatible with the GNU General Public License (GPL) due to restrictions the PHP License places on the usage of the term PHP.

Perl is a family of high-level, general-purpose, interpreted, dynamic programming languages. The languages in this family include Perl 5 and Raku. They provide advanced text processing facilities without the arbitrary data-length limits of many contemporary Unix command line tools, facilitating manipulation of text files. Perl 5 gained widespread popularity in the late 1990s as a CGI scripting language for the Web, in part due to its parsing abilities.

Python is a widely used general-purpose, high-level, interpreted, programming language. Python supports multiple programming paradigms, including object-oriented, imperative, functional and procedural paradigms. It features a dynamic type system, automatic memory management, a standard library, and strict use of whitespace. Like other dynamic languages, Python is often used as a scripting language, but is also used in a wide range of non-scripting contexts.

== High availability and load balancing ==
Specific approaches are required for websites that serve large numbers of requests, or provide services that demand high uptime. High-availability approaches for the LAMP stack may involve multiple web and database servers, combined with additional components that perform logical aggregation of resources provided by each of the servers, as well as distribution of the workload across multiple servers. The aggregation of web servers may be provided by placing a load balancer in front of them, for example by using Linux Virtual Server (LVS). For the aggregation of database servers, MySQL provides internal replication mechanisms that implement a master/slave relationship between the original database (master) and its copies (slaves).

Such high-availability setups may also improve the availability of LAMP instances by providing various forms of redundancy, making it possible for a certain number of components (separate servers) to experience downtime without interrupting the users of services provided as a whole. Such redundant setups may also handle hardware failures resulting in data loss on individual servers in a way that prevents collectively stored data from actually becoming lost. Beside higher availability, such LAMP setups are capable of providing almost linear improvements in performance for services having the number of internal database read operations much higher than the number of write/update operations.

== Variants ==
The LAMP model has been adapted to other componentry, though typically consisting of free and open-source software. With the growing use of the archetypal LAMP, variations and retronyms appeared for other combinations of operating system, web server, database, and software language. For example, an equivalent installation on the Microsoft Windows operating system family is known as WAMP. An alternative running IIS in place of Apache is called WIMP. Variants involving other operating systems include DAMP, which uses the Darwin operating system.

The web server or database management system also varies. LEMP is a version where Apache has been replaced with the more lightweight web server nginx. A version where MySQL has been replaced by PostgreSQL is called LAPP, or sometimes by keeping the original acronym, LAMP (Linux / Apache / Middleware (Perl, PHP, Python, Ruby) / PostgreSQL).

The LAMP bundle can be combined with many other free and open-source software packages, including:

- netsniff-ng for security testing and hardening
- Snort, an intrusion detection (IDS) and intrusion prevention (IPS) system
- RRDtool for diagrams
- Nagios, Collectd or Cacti, for monitoring.

As another example, the software which Wikipedia and other Wikimedia Foundation projects use for their underlying infrastructure is a customized LAMP stack with additions such as Linux Virtual Server (LVS) for load balancing and Ceph and Swift for distributed object storages.

== See also ==
- JAMstack
- LYME – a software stack based on Erlang
- MEAN – a JavaScript software stack for building dynamic web sites and web applications
- Solution stack
- Web content management system
- Web Platform Installer
