= Method (computer programming) =

Function that is tied to a particular instance or class

A method in object-oriented programming (OOP) is a procedure associated with an object, and generally also a message. An object consists of state data and behavior; these compose an interface, which specifies how the object may be used. A method is a behavior of an object parametrized by a user.

Data is represented as properties of the object, and behaviors are represented as methods. For example, a Window object could have methods such as open and close, while its state (whether it is open or closed at any given point in time) would be a property.

In class-based programming, methods are defined within a class, and objects are instances of a given class. One of the most important capabilities that a method provides is method overriding - the same name (e.g., area) can be used for multiple different kinds of classes. This allows the sending objects to invoke behaviors and to delegate the implementation of those behaviors to the receiving object. A method in Java programming sets the behavior of a class object. For example, an object can send an area message to another object and the appropriate formula is invoked whether the receiving object is a Rectangle, Circle, Triangle, etc.

Methods also provide the interface that other classes use to access and modify the properties of an object; this is known as encapsulation. Encapsulation and overriding are the two primary distinguishing features between methods and procedure calls.

== Overriding and overloading ==
Method overriding and overloading are two of the most significant ways that a method differs from a conventional procedure or function call. Overriding refers to a subclass redefining the implementation of a method of its superclass. For example, findArea may be a method defined on a shape class, Triangle, etc. would each define the appropriate formula to calculate their area. The idea is to look at objects as "black boxes" so that changes to the internals of the object can be made with minimal impact on the other objects that use it. This is known as encapsulation and is meant to make code easier to maintain and re-use.

Method overloading, on the other hand, refers to differentiating the code used to handle a message based on the parameters of the method. If one views the receiving object as the first parameter in any method then overriding is just a special case of overloading where the selection is based only on the first argument.

== Accessor, mutator and manager methods ==
Accessor methods are used to read the data values of an object. Mutator methods are used to modify the data of an object. Manager methods are used to initialize and destroy objects of a class, e.g. constructors and destructors.

These methods provide an abstraction layer that facilitates encapsulation and modularity. For example, if a bank-account class provides a getBalance() accessor method to retrieve the current balance (rather than directly accessing the balance data fields), then later revisions of the same code can implement a more complex mechanism for balance retrieval (e.g., a database fetch), without the dependent code needing to be changed. The concepts of encapsulation and modularity are not unique to object-oriented programming. Indeed, in many ways the object-oriented approach is simply the logical extension of previous paradigms such as abstract data types and structured programming.

=== Constructors ===
A constructor is a method that is called at the beginning of an object's lifetime to create and initialize the object, a process called construction (or instantiation). Initialization may include an acquisition of resources. Constructors may have parameters but usually do not return values in most languages. See the following example in Java:

public class Person {
    private String name;
    private int age;

    // constructor method
    public Person(String name, int age) {
        this.name = name;
        this.age = age;
    }
}

=== Destructor ===
A Destructor is a method that is called automatically at the end of an object's lifetime, a process called destruction. Destruction in most languages does not allow destructor method arguments nor return values. Destructors can be implemented so as to perform cleanup chores and other tasks at object destruction.

==== Finalizers ====
In garbage-collected languages, such as Java, C#, and Python, destructors are known as finalizers. They have a similar purpose and function to destructors, but because of the differences between languages that utilize garbage-collection and languages with manual memory management, the sequence in which they are called is different.

== Abstract methods ==
An abstract method is one with only a signature and no implementation body. It is often used to specify that a subclass must provide an implementation of the method, as in an abstract class. Abstract methods are used to specify interfaces in some programming languages.

=== Example ===

The following Java code shows an abstract class that needs to be extended:

abstract class Shape {
    // abstract method signature
    abstract int area(int height, int width);
}

The following subclass extends the main class:

public class Rectangle extends Shape {
    @Override
    int area(int height, int width) {
        return height * width;
    }
}

=== Reabstraction ===
If a subclass provides an implementation for an abstract method, another subclass can make it abstract again. This is called reabstraction.

In practice, this is rarely used.

==== Example ====
In C#, a virtual method can be overridden with an abstract method. (This also applies to Java, where all non-private methods are virtual.)

class IA
{
    public virtual void M()
    {
        // ...
    }
}

abstract class IB : IA
{
    // allowed
    public override abstract void M();
}

Interfaces' default methods can also be reabstracted, requiring subclasses to implement them. (This also applies to Java.)

interface IA
{
    void M() 
    { 
        // ...
    }
}

interface IB : IA
{
    abstract void IA.M();
}

// error: class 'C' does not implement 'IA.M'.
class C : IB 
{ 
    // ...
}

== Class methods ==
Class methods are methods that are called on a class rather than an instance. They are typically used as part of an object meta-model. I.e, for each class, defined an instance of the class object in the meta-model is created. Meta-model protocols allow classes to be created and deleted. In this sense, they provide the same functionality as constructors and destructors described above. But in some languages such as the Common Lisp Object System (CLOS) the meta-model allows the developer to dynamically alter the object model at run time: e.g., to create new classes, redefine the class hierarchy, modify properties, etc.

== Special methods ==
Special methods are very language-specific and a language may support none, some, or all of the special methods defined here. A language's compiler may automatically generate default special methods or a programmer may be allowed to optionally define special methods. Most special methods cannot be directly called, but rather the compiler generates code to call them at appropriate times.

=== Static methods ===
Static methods are meant to be relevant to all the instances of a class rather than to any specific instance. They are similar to static variables in that sense. An example would be a static method to sum the values of all the variables of every instance of a class. For example, if there were a Product class it might have a static method to compute the average price of all products.

A static method can be invoked even if no instances of the class exist yet. Static methods are called "static" because they are resolved at compile time based on the class they are called on and not dynamically as in the case with instance methods, which are resolved polymorphically based on the runtime type of the object.

==== Examples ====
===== In Java =====
In Java, a commonly used static method is Math.max().

// called like:
Math.max(a, b);

// declared like:
public class Math {
    // ...

    public static double max(double a, double b) {
        return (a < b) ? b : a;
    }
}

This static method has no owning object and does not run on an instance. It receives all information from its arguments.

=== Copy-assignment operators ===
Copy-assignment operators define actions to be performed by the compiler when a class object is assigned to a class object of the same type.

=== Operator methods ===
Operator methods define or redefine operator symbols and define the operations to be performed with the symbol and the associated method parameters. C++ example:

import std;

using std::string;

class Person {
private:
    string name;
    int age;
public:
    bool operator<(const Person& other) const {
        return age < other.age;
    }

    bool operator==(const Person& other) const {
        return name == other.name && age == other.age;
    }
};

== Member functions in C++ ==
Some procedural languages were extended with object-oriented capabilities to leverage the large skill sets and legacy code for those languages but still provide the benefits of object-oriented development. Perhaps the most well-known example is C++, an object-oriented extension of the C programming language. Due to the design requirements to add the object-oriented paradigm on to an existing procedural language, message passing in C++ has some unique capabilities and terminologies. For example, in C++ a method is known as a member function. C++ also has the concept of virtual functions which are member functions that can be overridden in derived classes and allow for dynamic dispatch.

=== Virtual functions ===
Virtual functions are the means by which a C++ class can achieve polymorphic behavior. Non-virtual member functions, or regular methods, are those that do not participate in polymorphism.

C++ Example:

import std;

using std::unique_ptr;

class Base {
public:
    virtual ~Base() = default;

    virtual void getMessage() {
        std::println("I'm the super class!");
    }
};

class Derived : public Base {
public:
    void getMessage() override { 
        std::println("I'm the subclass!);
    }
};

int main() {
    unique_ptr<Base> base = std::make_unique<Base>();
    unique_ptr<Base> derived = std::make_unique<Derived>();

    base->getMessage(); // Calls Base::getMessage().
    derived->getMessage(); // Calls Derived::getMessage().
}

== See also ==
- Property (programming)
- Remote method invocation
- Subroutine, also called subprogram, routine, procedure or function
