= Lapsed listener problem =

Common source of memory leaks in software with an observer pattern

In computer programming, the lapsed listener problem is a common source of memory leaks for object-oriented programming languages, among the most common ones for garbage collected languages.

It originates in the observer pattern, where observers (or listeners) register with a subject (or publisher) to receive events. In basic implementation, this requires both explicit registration and explicit deregistration, as in the dispose pattern, because the subject holds strong references to the observers, keeping them alive. The leak happens when an observer fails to unsubscribe from the subject when it no longer needs to listen. Consequently, the subject still holds a reference to the observer which prevents it from being garbage collected — including all other objects it is referring to — for as long as the subject is alive, which could be until the end of the application.

This causes not only a memory leak, but also a performance degradation with an "uninterested" observer receiving and acting on unwanted events. This can be prevented by the subject holding weak references to the observers, allowing them to be garbage collected as normal without needing to be unregistered.
