= Erez Petrank =

Israeli computer scientist

- ארז פטרנק
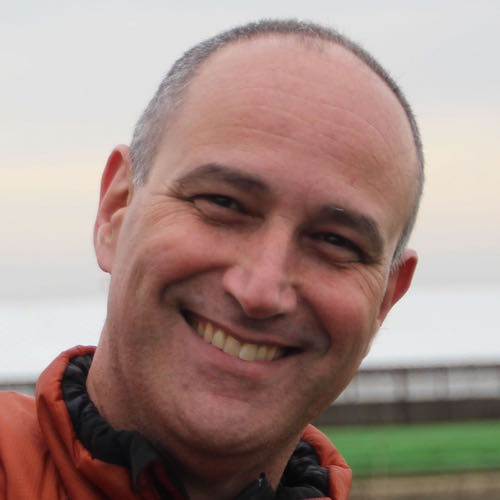
- Known for: Memory management algorithms (reference counting update coalescing, concurrent garbage collection, the compressor compator), making wait-free practical, and various zero-knowledge protocols (including concurrent and non-interactive).
- Awards: OOPSLA 2019 Distinguished Paper Award; PODC Best Dissertation Award for Timnat’s Ph.D. dissertation under the supervision of Prof. Petrank; Technion Distinguished Teaching Award (more than 10 times); Euro-Par 2015 Best Paper Award; DISC 2013 Best Paper Award; The Yanai Prize for Excellence in Academic Education 2012; VEE 2009 Best Paper Award; Simon Many Prize for Excellence in Teaching 2004; Coleman-Cohen Prize for Excellence in Teaching 2001, 2002; Rothschild Scholarship for Post-Doctoral Studies 1995
- Scientific career
- Fields: Computer science
- Workplaces: Technion
- Doctoral advisor: Oded Goldreich

Erez Petrank (Hebrew: ארז פטרנק) is a computer scientist whose notable research contributions are in the fields of programming languages and computer systems (mostly on memory management), cryptography (mostly on theoretical foundations), computational complexity, and parallel computing. Petrank is currently (2024) a professor of computer science at the Technion - Israel Institute of Technology, where he holds the Andrew and Erna Viterbi Chair.

Petrank has published more than ninety papers in top conferences and journals with more than 7000 citations and an h-index of 49 (computed by Google Scholar). He has served as the program chair of the International Symposium on Memory Management, the ACM SIGPLAN/SIGOPS International Conference on Virtual Execution Environments (VEE), the ACM SIGPLAN Symposium on Principles and Practice of Parallel Programming (PPOPP), and the ACM Symposium on Parallelism in Algorithms and Architectures (SPAA). From 2009 to 2012, Petrank served on the Association for Computing Machinery SIGPLAN Executive Committee.

Professor Petrank is married to Yael Petrank, who holds a Ph.D. in Biomedical Engineering and is actively involved in the development of medical devices. Together, they are parents to three children: Dana, Maya, and Iddo.
