= Destructor (computer programming) =

Function called at the end of an object's lifetime

In object-oriented programming, a destructor (sometimes abbreviated dtor) is a method which is invoked mechanically just before the memory of the object is released. It can happen either when its lifetime is bound to scope and the execution leaves the scope, when it is embedded in another object whose lifetime ends, or when it was allocated dynamically and is released explicitly. Its main purpose is to free the resources (memory allocations, open files or sockets, database connections, resource locks, etc.) which were acquired by the object during its life and/or deregister from other entities which may keep references to it. Destructors are necessary in resource acquisition is initialization (RAII).

With most kinds of automatic garbage collection algorithms, the releasing of memory may happen a long time after the object becomes unreachable, making destructors unsuitable for time-critical purposes. In these languages, the freeing of resources is done through a lexical construct (such as try-finally, Python's with, or Java's "try-with-resources"), or by explicitly calling a function (equivalent to explicit deletion); in particular, many object-oriented languages use the dispose pattern.

== Syntax ==
- C++: destructors have the same name as the class with which they are associated, but with a tilde prefix (for example, a class X with a constructor X() has a destructor ~X()). The destructor is called when an object's lifetime ends; if it is heap-allocated, it may be called manually by delete.
- C#: same syntax as C++ (~X()). Historically called destructors, now called finalizers due to confusion. Internally, it translates to a call to Finalize() inside System.Object. For freeing resources at the end of a using-with-resources block, the Dispose() method of System.IDisposable interface is used.
- D: declared as ~this() (whereas constructors are declared as this()). Until its removal in D 2.111.0, D had a delete keyword that called the destructor.
- Java: there are no destructors in Java like C++ or C#. java.lang.Object has a finalize() method, which may be called by the object collector (but is not guaranteed to be); overriding it has been deprecated since Java 9. java.lang.ref.Cleaner is recommended as a safer replacement to Object.finalize(). For freeing resources at the end of a try-with-resources block, the close() method of the java.lang.AutoCloseable interface is used.
- Object Pascal: destructor methods have the keyword destructor and can be any name, but convention is Destroy().
- Objective-C: destructor method is named dealloc.
- Perl: destructor method is named DESTROY; in the Moose object system extension, it is named DEMOLISH.
- PHP: In PHP 5+, destructor method is named __destruct. There were no destructors in prior versions of PHP.
- Python: destructor method is named __del__(). Called destructors in Python 2, now called finalizers in Python 3. The del keyword deletes a variable name/reference to an object, but does not directly call __del__().
- Rust: destructor method is named drop() and is provided by the std::ops::Drop trait.
- Swift: destructor method is named deinit, but does not have parameters and is simply declared as a block (i.e. deinit { /* ... */ }).

The keyword delete exists in the ECMAScript specification (and in dialects such as JavaScript and TypeScript), but unlike C++'s delete, delete in ECMAScript only removes a property from a class rather than deallocating and freeing the object.

== Language details ==
=== C ===
As C does not have objects, it has neither constructors nor destructors. However, they can be emulated using functions that allocate and destroy, to abstract away manual calls to malloc() and free().

#include <stdio.h>
#include <stdlib.h>

typedef struct {
    void* data; // Some resource, could be anything
    size_t size; // Size of the resource
} Resource;

// The "constructor"
Resource* createResource(size_t size) {
    Resource* res = (Resource*)malloc(sizeof(Resource));
    if (!res) {
        fprintf(stderr, "Failed to allocate memory for resource.\n");
        return NULL;
    }
    res->data = malloc(size);
    if (!res->data) {
        fprintf(stderr, "Failed to allocate memory for resource data.\n");
        free(res);
        return NULL;
    }
    res->size = size;
    return res;
}

// The "destructor"
void destroyResource(Resource* res) {
    if (res) {
        if (res->data) {
            free(res->data);
        }
        free(res);
    }
}

int main() {
    // Allocate the resource of 50 bytes
    Resource* myResource = createResource(50);

    if (!myResource) {
        return 1;
    }

    for (size_t i = 0; i < myResource->size; ++i) {
        ((char*)myResource->data)[i] = (char)(i % 256); // Just some dummy data
    }

    printf("First 10 bytes of resource data: ");
    for (size_t i = 0; i < 10; ++i) {
        printf("%d ", ((char*)myResource->data)[i]);
    }
    printf("\n");

    // Free the resource
    destroyResource(myResource);
}

==== GCC extensions ====
The GNU Compiler Collection's C compiler comes with 2 extensions that allow implementing destructors:

- The [[gnu::destructor]] function attribute allows defining global prioritized destructor functions: when main() returns, these functions are called in priority order before the process terminates. See also: Hacking the art of exploitation.
- The [[gnu::cleanup(func)]] variable attribute allows attaching a destructor function to a variable: the function is called when the variable goes out of scope.

=== C++ ===
The destructor has the same name as the class, but with a tilde (~) before it. For example, a class called Foo will have the destructor ~Foo(). Destructors have neither parameters nor return types. As stated above, a destructor for an object is called whenever the object's lifetime ends. If the object was created as an automatic variable, its lifetime ends and the destructor is called automatically when the object goes out of scope. Because C++ does not have garbage collection, if the object was created with new (dynamically on the heap), then its destructor is called when the delete operator is applied to a pointer to the object. Usually that operation occurs within another destructor, typically the destructor of a smart pointer object.

In inheritance hierarchies, the declaration of a virtual destructor in the base class ensures that the destructors of derived classes are invoked properly when an object is deleted through a pointer-to-base-class. Objects that may be deleted in this way need to inherit a virtual destructor.

A destructor should never throw an exception; all destructors are implicitly marked noexcept, but can be allowed to throw if explicitly marked noexcept(false). If a class inherits from a class with a throwing destructor, or has a member variable whose destructor throws, then its destructor will not be implicitly noexcept.

Non-class scalar types have what is called a pseudo-destructor which can be accessed by using typedef or template arguments. This construct makes it possible to write code without having to know if a destructor exists for a given type.

template <typename T>
T dangerous(T a) {
    a.~T();
    return a;
}

int b = dangerous<int>(123); // still returns 123, since 123 has no destructor

In older versions of the standard, pseudo-destructors were specified to have no effect, however that was changed in a defect report to make them end the lifetime of the object they are called on.

In C++/CLI, which has both destructors and finalizers, a destructor is a method whose name is the class name with ~ prefixed, as in ~Foo() (as in C#), and a finalizer is a method whose name is the class name with ! prefixed, as in !Foo().

Objects which cannot be safely copied and/or assigned should be disabled from such semantics by declaring their corresponding functions as deleted. A detailed description of this method can be found in Scott Meyers' popular book, Effective Modern C++ (Item 11: "Prefer deleted functions to private undefined ones."). If they are delete, they should be public so that accidental uses do not warn that they are private, but explicitly deleted. Since C++26, it is possible to specify a reason for the deletion with the ~X() = delete("Reason"); syntax.

C++ has functions std::destroy()/std::destroy_at()/std::destroy_n() (and the range versions std::ranges::destroy()/std::ranges::destroy_at()/std::ranges::destroy_n()), which destroys/ends the lifetime of the object. However, when called on a non-class type, it only calls the pseudo-destructor, which does not actually end the lifetime.

==== Example ====
import std;

using std::formatter;
using std::format_parse_context;

class Foo {
private:
    size_t length;
    char* data;
    friend struct formatter<Foo>;
public:
    // Constructor
    explicit Foo(const char s[] = ""):
        length{std::strlen(s)},
        data{new char[length + 1]} {
        std::strcpy(data, s);
    }

    Foo(const Foo&) = delete("Copy construction disabled");
    Foo& operator=(const Foo&) = delete("Copy assignment disabled");

    // Destructor
    ~Foo() { 
        delete[] data; 
    }
};

template <>
struct std::formatter<Foo> {
    // Definition of Formatter for Foo here
};

int main(int argc, char* argv[]) {
    Foo foo("Hello from the stack!");
    std::println("{}", foo);

    Foo* foo = new Foo("Hello from the heap!");
    std::println("{}", *foo);
    delete foo;
}

By using smart pointers with the "Resource Acquisition is Initialization" (RAII) idiom, manual resource cleanup can be abstracted. Other languages like Java and C# include a finally block for cleanup, however C++ does not have the finally block and instead encourages using the RAII idiom.

import std;

using std::formatter;
using std::format_parse_context;
using std::unique_ptr;

class Foo {
private:
    unique_ptr<char[]> data;
    friend struct formatter<Foo>;
public:
    // Constructor
    explicit Foo(const char s[] = ""):
        length{std::strlen(s)},
        data{std::make_unique<char[]>(length + 1)} {
        std::strcpy(data.get(), s);
    }

    Foo(const Foo&) = delete("Copy construction disabled");
    Foo& operator=(const Foo&) = delete("Copy assignment disabled");

    // Destructor is automatically handled by unique_ptr
    ~Foo() = default;
};

template <>
struct std::formatter<Foo> {
    // Definition of Formatter for Foo here
};

int main(int argc, char* argv[]) {
    Foo foo("Hello from the stack!");
    std::println("{}", foo);

    unique_ptr<Foo> foo = std::make_unique<Foo>("Hello from the heap!");
    std::println("{}", *foo);
}

Any class may have only one destructor. However, it is possible for a templated class to have define multiple destructors through requires clauses.

import std;

using std::is_trivially_destructible_v;

template <typename T>
class Foo {
private:
    T* ptr;
public:
    ~Foo() requires (!is_trivially_destructible_v<T>) {
        delete ptr;
    }

    ~Foo() = default;
};

While this appears to define multiple destructors, the compiler still chooses one destructor at compile-time based on the type constraint. For instance, Foo<int> will just receive the default destructor, but for a non-trivially destructible type Bar, Foo<Bar>'s destructor will instead be the destructor which performs delete ptr;.

=== C# ===
The destructor of a class X in C# is ~X(), which has no parameters, and like the constructor, has no return type. Internally, it calls System.Object's Finalize() method, which itself cannot be called or overriden directly.

C# also has a "dispose" pattern in which the class must implement the interface System.IDisposable. C# supports try-with-resources blocks similar to Java, called using-with-resources. A class must implement System.IDisposable to be used in a using-with-resources block.

namespace Wikipedia.Examples;

using System;
using System.Collections.Generic;
using System.Data.SqlClient;

public record User(int Id, string Name, string Email);

public class UserUnitOfWork : IDisposable
{
    private readonly SqlConnection _connection;
    private SqlTransaction _transaction;
    private bool _disposed;

    public UserUnitOfWork(string url)
    {
        _connection = new(url);
        _connection.Open();
        _transaction = _connection.BeginTransaction();
    }

    public List<User> GetActiveUsers()
    {
        // ...
    }

    public void Commit()
    {
        _transaction?.Commit();
    }

    public void Dispose()
    {
        if (_disposed)
        {
            return;
        }
        try
        {
            _transaction?.Dispose();
            _connection?.Close();
            _connection?.Dispose();
        }
        finally
        {
            _disposed = true;
        }
    }
}

class Program
{
    static void Main(string[] args)
    {
        using (UserUnitOfWork uow = new(/* connection string */)
        {
            Console.WriteLine("Using UserUnitOfWork...");
            List<User> users = uow.GetActiveUsers();
            uow.Commit();
            // ...
        }
        // Connection, transaction closed here
    }
}

Destructors in C# are not manually called or called by a delete operator like in C++. They are only called by the garbage collector.

UML class in C# containing a constructor and a destructor.

However, finalizers should only be used when absolutely necessary, such as handling unmanaged resources like pointers and native handles. This is because adding a finalizer moves the object to the finalization queue and requires at least two garbage collection cycles, which slows performance and increases memory pressure.

namespace Wikipedia.Examples;

using System;

class NativeResourceHolder : IDisposable
{
    private IntPtr _nativeHandle;
    private bool _disposed;

    public NativeResourceHolder()
    {
        _nativeHandle = AllocateNative();
    }

    public void Dispose()
    {
        Dispose(true);
        GC.SuppressFinalize(this);
    }

    // The Finalizer
    ~NativeResourceHolder()
    {
        Dispose(false);
    }

    protected virtual void Dispose(bool disposing)
    {
        if (!_dipsosed)
        {
            // Free managed resources here, if any
        }
        FreeNative(_nativeHandle);
        _disposed = true;
    }

    private IntPtr AllocateNative() => new IntPtr(42);
    private void FreeNative(IntPtr ptr)
    { /* ... */ }
}

class Program
{
    static void Main(string[] args)
    {
        NativeResourceHolder obj = new();
        
        GC.Collect();
        GC.WaitForPendingFinalizers();

        Console.WriteLine("Program finished");
    }
}

=== D ===
The following demonstrates the usage of a destructor in D.

import std.stdio;

struct Integer {
    int x;

    this(int value) {
        x = value;
        writeln("Constructor called with x = ", x);
    }

    ~this() {
        writeln("Destructor called for x = ", x);
    }
}

void main() {
    {
        Integer s = Integer(10);
        writeln("Inside scope");
    } // Destructor runs here

    writeln("Outside scope");
}

Until D 2.111.0, the delete keyword existed, which was used to immediately call a destructor and free memory.

=== Java ===
In Java there are destructors (~X()) like those seen in C++ and C#, however its closest equivalent in typical Java is the java.lang.AutoCloseable interface with the close() method. A class that implements java.lang.AutoCloseable may be used in a "try-with-resources" block, which automatically calls its close() method upon the end of scope, available since Java 7. Unlike destructors, however, clean() methods are used for resource cleanup, rather than memory deallocation, as memory is reclaimed through garbage collection.

package org.wikipedia.examples;

import java.sql.Connection;
import java.sql.DriverManager;
import java.sql.SQLException;
import java.util.ArrayList;
import java.util.List;

public record User(int id, String name, String Email) {}

class UserUnitOfWork implements AutoCloseable {
    private final Connection conn;
    private bool committed = false;

    public UserUnitOfWork(String url, String username, String password) throws SQLException {
        this.connection = DriverManager.getConnection(url, username, password);
        this.connection.setAutoCommit(false);
    }

    public List<User> getActiveUsers() throws SQLException {
        // ...
    }

    public void commit() throws SQLException {
        connection.commit();
        committed = true;
    }

    @Override
    public void close() throws SQLException {
        try {
            if (!committed) {
                connection.rollback();
            }
        } finally {
            connection.close();
        }
    }
}

public class Example {
    public static void main(String[] args) {
        try (UserUnitOfWork uow = new UserUnitOfWork(/* URL and credentials */)) {
            System.out.println("Using UserUnitOfWork...");
            List<User> users = uow.getActiveUsers();
            uow.commit();
            // ...
        }
        // after try-with-resources, d.close() will be called
    }
}

Prior to Java 7, a "try-finally" block was used, where the d.close() call was put inside the finally block.

Historically, Java used the finalize() method of java.lang.Object, however this has been deprecated since Java 9, as there are no guarantees which thread will invoke the finalize() method for any given object, or even that it will be invoked at all. Finalizers are non-deterministic (unlike destructors in C++), and releasing critical resources in a finalize() call may lead to unpredictable behavior..

Java has a method called gc() in java.lang.System and java.lang.Runtime to suggest the Java Virtual Machine (JVM) to perform garbage collection, which is internally equivalent to a Runtime.getRuntime().gc() call, which requests the garbage collector to trigger a garbage collection cycle, but this is not guaranteed, as the JVM manages memory independently. System.gc() may lead to finalize() being called, but only if the object is eligible for garbage collection and has a finalize() method.

package org.wikipedia.examples;

class ParentFinalizerExample { /* ... */ }

class FinalizerExample extends ParentFinalizerExample {
    @Override
    protected void finalize() throws Throwable {
        try {
            System.out.println("finalize() called, cleaning up...");
        } finally {
            super.finalize(); // Always call super.finalize() to clean parent classes
        }
    }
}

public class Example {
    public static void main(String[] args) {
        FinalizerExample obj = new FinalizerExample ();
        obj = null;
        System.gc(); // Requests garbage collection (not guaranteed)
    }
}

Java also supports classes java.lang.ref.Cleaner and java.lang.ref.PhantomReference for safer low-level cleanup. java.lang.ref.Cleaner was introduced in Java 9 and is more efficient than java.lang.ref.PhantomReference, and works by registering an object with a cleaner thread which runs a cleanup action once the object is unreachable (i.e. no references to it exist). Much like java.lang.AutoCloseable, it does not reclaim memory, which is instead done by garbage collection.

package org.wikipedia.examples;

import java.lang.ref.Cleaner;
import java.lang.ref.Cleaner.Cleanable;

class Resource {
    private static final Cleaner cleaner = Cleaner.create();

    static class State implements Runnable {
        private boolean cleaned = false;

        @Override
        public void run() {
            cleaned = true;
            System.out.println("Cleaned using Cleaner");
        }
    }

    private final State state;
    private final Cleanable cleanable;

    public Resource () {
        this.state = new State();
        this.cleanable = cleaner.register(this, state);
    }

    public void cleanup() {
        System.gc(); // Request garbage collection (not guaranteed)
    }
}

public class Example {
    public static void main(String[] args) {
        Resource resource = new Resource();
        resource = null;
        resource.cleanup();
    }
}

java.lang.ref.PhantomReference, since Java 1.2, is an older cleanup mechanism that uses a reference queue. java.lang.ref.PhantomReference is used solely for being notified that an object's garbage collection is pending. Once the object is garbage collected, the java.lang.ref.PhantomReference is enqueued into the java.lang.ref.ReferenceQueue. Unlike java.lang.ref.WeakReference which can be used to access the object if it still exists in memory, java.lang.ref.PhantomReference can only be used for detecting when an object will be destroyed. Both java.lang.ref.PhantomReference and java.lang.ref.WeakReference do not increase reference counts.

package org.wikipedia.examples;

import java.lang.ref.PhantomReference;
import java.lang.ref.ReferenceQueue;

class Resource {
    private final String name;

    public Resource(String name) {
        this.name = name;
    }

    public String getName() {
        return name;
    }
}

public class PhantomReferenceExample {
    public static void main(String[] args) throws InterruptedException {
        Resource resource = new Resource("My resource");
        ReferenceQueue<Resource> queue = new ReferenceQueue<>();
        PhantomReference<Resource> phantomRef = new PhantomReference<>(resource, queue);

        resource = null;

        System.gc();

        Reference<? extends Resource> ref = queue.poll();
        if (ref != null) {
            System.out.printf("Object is ready to be collected: %s%n", ((PhantomReference<?>)ref).get());
        }
    }
}

Unlike to std::weak_ptr in C++ which is used to reference an object without increasing its reference count, java.lang.ref.WeakReference can still access the object after the reference count reaches 0, whereas in C++ std::weak_ptr cannot as the object is immediately destroyed once the object reaches 0 references.

=== Python ===
Python supports destructors and has a del keyword, but unlike delete in C++, del only decreases the reference count of the object, and does not necessarily immediately destroy the object.

class Destructible:
    def __init__(self, name: str) -> None:
        self.name: str = name
        print(f"Created Destructible: {self.name}")

    def __del__(self) -> None:
        print(f"Destructor called for: {self.name}")

if __name__ == "__main__":
    d: Destructible = Destructible("My name")
    print(f"Using Destructible: {d.name}")
    del d

Much like Java and C#, Python has an equivalent to the try-with-resources block, called a with block or a "context manager". It is used for things like files and network connections.

class Destructible:
    def __init__(self, name: str) -> None:
        self.name: str = name

    def __enter__(self) -> "Destructible":
        print(f"Entering context (allocating resource: {self.name})")
        return self

    def __exit__(self, exc_type: type | None, exc_val: Exception | None, exc_tb: type | None) -> None:
        print(f"Exiting context (cleaning up resource: {self.name})")

if __name__ == "__main__":
    with Destructible("Resource A") as d:
        print(f"Using resource {d.name} inside context")

    # Most Python standard library resources support with blocks:
    with open(file_path, "r") as file:
        print("Reading the file content:")
        content: str = file.read()
        print(content)

=== Rust ===
Rust does not have destructors in the sense of object-oriented programming, but a struct can implement the std::ops::Drop trait and the drop method to clean itself up after it goes out of scope.

It is not possible to destroy objects explicitly through a delete operator like in C++, though it is possible to manually call drop() prematurely by using std::mem::drop().

use std::mem;

struct Destructible {
    name: String,
}

impl Destructible {
    fn new(name: String) -> Self {
        Destructible { name }
    }
}

impl Drop for Destructible {
    fn drop(&mut self) {
        println!("Dropping Destructible: {}", self.name);
    }
}

fn main() {
    {
        let resource_a: Destructible = Destructible::new(String::from("Resource A"));
        println!("Using Destructible.");
    } // <--- resource_a goes out of scope here, `drop()` is called automatically

    let resource_b: Destructible = Destructible::new(String::from("Resource B"));
    println!("Dropping Destructible prematurely.");
    mem::drop(resource_b);
}

While lifetimes control the validity of references, they do not determine when drop() is called.

=== TypeScript ===
Although TypeScript does not have manual memory management, it has resource management similar to using-with-resource blocks in C# or try-with-resources blocks in Java, or C++ resource acquisition is initialization, that automatically close resources without need for finally blocks. In TypeScript, to automatically close an object, it must implement a global interface Disposable, and implement a method Symbol.dispose(). This will automatically be called at the end of scope.

import * as fs from 'fs';

class TempFile implements Disposable {
    #path: string;
    #handle: number;

    constructor(path: string) {
        this.#path = path;
        this.#handle = fs.openSync(path, "w+");
    }

    write(data: string): void {
        fs.writeSync(this.#handle, data);
    }

    [Symbol.dispose](): void {
        fs.closeSync(this.#handle);
        fs.unlinkSync(this.#path);
    }
}

export function doSomeWork() {
    using file: TempFile = new TempFile(".some_temp_file.txt");

    if (someCondition()) {
        // do something here
    }
}

=== Xojo ===
Destructors in Xojo (REALbasic) can be in one of two forms. Each form uses a regular method declaration with a special name (with no parameters and no return value). The older form uses the same name as the Class with a ~ (tilde) prefix. The newer form uses the name Destructor. The newer form is preferred because it makes refactoring the class easier.

Class Foobar
  // Old form
  Sub ~Foobar()
  End Sub

  // New form
  Sub Destructor()
  End Sub
End Class

== See also ==
- new and delete (C++)
- Finalizer
- Constructor (computer science)
- Object lifetime
- Resource Acquisition Is Initialization
- Rule of three (C++ programming)
