= Zero knowledge =

Zero knowledge may mean:

- Zero-knowledge proof, a concept from cryptography, an interactive method for one party to prove to another that a (usually mathematical) statement is true, without revealing anything other than the veracity of the statement
  - Non-interactive zero-knowledge proof, a common random string shared between the prover and the verifier is enough to achieve computational zero-knowledge without requiring interaction
  - Zero-knowledge password proof, an interactive method for one party (the prover) to prove to another party (the verifier) that it knows the value of a password
- Zero-knowledge service, a term referring to one type of privacy-oriented online services
