= Garbage collection (computer science) =

Form of automatic memory management

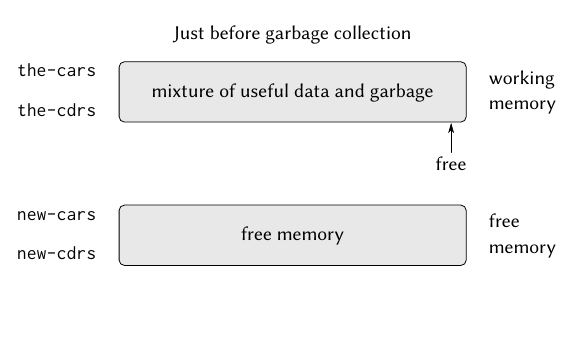
Stop-and-copy garbage collection in a Lisp architecture: Memory is divided into working and free memory; new objects are allocated in the former. When it is full (depicted), garbage collection is performed: All data structures still in use are located by pointer tracing and copied into consecutive locations in free memory.

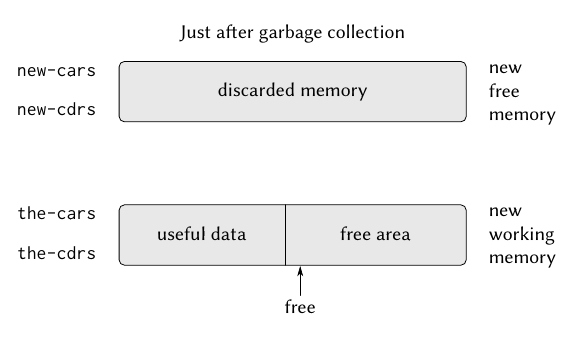
After that, the working memory contents is discarded in favor of the compacted copy, and the role of working and free memory are exchanged (depicted).

In computer science, garbage collection (GC) is a form of automatic memory management. The garbage collector attempts to reclaim memory that was allocated by the program, but is no longer referenced; such memory is called garbage. Garbage collection was invented by American computer scientist John McCarthy around 1959 to simplify manual memory management in Lisp.

Garbage collection relieves the programmer from doing manual memory management, where the programmer specifies what objects to de-allocate and return to the memory system and when to do so. Other, similar techniques include stack allocation, region inference, and memory ownership, and combinations thereof. Garbage collection may take a significant proportion of a program's total processing time, and affect performance as a result.

Resources other than memory, such as network sockets, database handles, windows, file descriptors, and device descriptors, are not typically handled by garbage collection, but rather by other methods (e.g. destructors). Some such methods de-allocate memory also.

== Overview ==
Many programming languages require garbage collection, either as part of the language specification (e.g., RPL, Java, C#, D, Go, and most scripting languages) or effectively for practical implementation (e.g., formal languages like lambda calculus). These are said to be garbage-collected languages. Other languages, such as C and C++, were designed for use with manual memory management, but have garbage-collected implementations available. Some languages, like Ada, Modula-3, and C++/CLI, allow both garbage collection and manual memory management to co-exist in the same application by using separate heaps for collected and manually managed objects. Still others, like D, are garbage-collected but allow the user to manually delete objects or even disable garbage collection entirely when speed is required.

Although many languages integrate GC into their compiler and runtime system, post-hoc GC systems also exist, such as Automatic Reference Counting (ARC). Some of these post-hoc GC systems do not require recompilation.

=== Advantages ===
GC frees the programmer from manually de-allocating memory. This helps avoid some kinds of errors:

- Dangling pointers, which occur when a piece of memory is freed while there are still pointers to it, and one of those pointers is dereferenced. By then the memory may have been reassigned to another use, with unpredictable results.
- Double free bugs, which occur when the program tries to free a region of memory that has already been freed, and perhaps already been allocated again.
- Certain kinds of memory leaks, in which a program fails to free memory occupied by objects that have become unreachable, which can lead to memory exhaustion.

=== Disadvantages ===
GC uses computing resources to decide which memory to free. Therefore, the penalty for the convenience of not annotating object lifetime manually in the source code is overhead, which can impair program performance. A peer-reviewed paper from 2005 concluded that GC needs five times the memory to compensate for this overhead and to perform as fast as the same program using idealized explicit memory management. The comparison however is made to a program generated by inserting deallocation calls using an oracle, implemented by collecting traces from programs run under a profiler, and the program is only correct for one particular execution of the program. Interaction with memory hierarchy effects can make this overhead intolerable in circumstances that are hard to predict or to detect in routine testing. The impact on performance was given by Apple as a reason for not adopting garbage collection in iOS, despite it being the most desired feature.

The moment when the garbage is actually collected can be unpredictable, resulting in stalls (pauses to shift/free memory) scattered throughout a session. Unpredictable stalls can be unacceptable in real-time environments, in transaction processing, or in interactive programs. Incremental, concurrent, and real-time garbage collectors address these problems, with varying trade-offs.

== Strategies ==
=== Tracing ===
Tracing garbage collection is the most common type of garbage collection, so much so that "garbage collection" often refers to tracing garbage collection, rather than other methods such as reference counting. The overall strategy consists of determining which objects should be garbage collected by tracing which objects are reachable by a chain of references from certain root objects, and considering the rest as garbage and collecting them. However, there are a large number of algorithms used in implementation, with widely varying complexity and performance characteristics.

=== Reference counting ===
Reference counting garbage collection is where each object has a count of the number of references to it. Garbage is identified by having a reference count of zero. An object's reference count is incremented when a reference to it is created and decremented when a reference is destroyed. When the count reaches zero, the object's memory is reclaimed.

As with manual memory management, and unlike tracing garbage collection, reference counting guarantees that objects are destroyed as soon as their last reference is destroyed, and usually only accesses memory which is either in CPU caches, in objects to be freed, or directly pointed to by those, and thus tends to not have significant negative side effects on CPU cache and virtual memory operation.

There are a number of disadvantages to reference counting; this can generally be solved or mitigated by more sophisticated algorithms:

Cycles
If two or more objects refer to each other, they can create a cycle whereby neither will be collected as their mutual references never let their reference counts become zero. Some garbage collection systems using reference counting (like the one in CPython) use specific cycle-detecting algorithms to deal with this issue. Another strategy is to use weak references for the "backpointers" which create cycles. Under reference counting, a weak reference is similar to a weak reference under a tracing garbage collector. It is a special reference object whose existence does not increment the reference count of the referent object. Furthermore, a weak reference is safe in that when the referent object becomes garbage, any weak reference to it lapses, rather than being permitted to remain dangling, meaning that it turns into a predictable value, such as a null reference.

Space overhead (reference count)
Reference counting requires space to be allocated for each object to store its reference count. The count may be stored adjacent to the object's memory or in a side table somewhere else, but in either case, every single reference-counted object requires additional storage for its reference count. Memory space with the size of an unsigned pointer is commonly used for this task, meaning that 32 or 64 bits of reference count storage must be allocated for each object. On some systems, it may be possible to mitigate this overhead by using a tagged pointer to store the reference count in unused areas of the object's memory. Often, an architecture does not actually allow programs to access the full range of memory addresses that could be stored in its native pointer size; a certain number of high bits in the address is either ignored or required to be zero. If an object reliably has a pointer at a certain location, the reference count can be stored in the unused bits of the pointer. For example, each object in Objective-C has a pointer to its class at the beginning of its memory; on the ARM64 architecture using iOS 7, 19 unused bits of this class pointer are used to store the object's reference count.

Speed overhead (increment/decrement)
In naive implementations, each assignment of a reference and each reference falling out of scope often require modifications of one or more reference counters. However, in a common case when a reference is copied from an outer scope variable into an inner scope variable, such that the lifetime of the inner variable is bounded by the lifetime of the outer one, the reference incrementing can be eliminated. The outer variable "owns" the reference. In the programming language C++, this technique is readily implemented and demonstrated with the use of const references. Reference counting in C++ is usually implemented using "smart pointers" whose constructors, destructors, and assignment operators manage the references. A smart pointer can be passed by reference to a function, which avoids the need to copy-construct a new smart pointer (which would increase the reference count on entry into the function and decrease it on exit). Instead, the function receives a reference to the smart pointer which is produced inexpensively. The Deutsch-Bobrow method of reference counting capitalizes on the fact that most reference count updates are in fact generated by references stored in local variables. It ignores these references, only counting references in the heap, but before an object with reference count zero can be deleted, the system must verify with a scan of the stack and register that no other reference to it still exists. A further substantial decrease in the overhead on counter updates can be obtained by update coalescing introduced by Levanoni and Petrank. Consider a pointer that in a given interval of the execution is updated several times. It first points to an object O1, then to an object O2, and so forth until at the end of the interval it points to some object On. A reference counting algorithm would typically execute rc(O1)--, rc(O2)++, rc(O2)--, rc(O3)++, rc(O3)--, ..., rc(On)++. But most of these updates are redundant. In order to have the reference count properly evaluated at the end of the interval it is enough to perform rc(O1)-- and rc(On)++. Levanoni and Petrank measured an elimination of more than 99% of the counter updates in typical Java benchmarks.

Requires atomicity
When used in a multithreaded environment, these modifications (increment and decrement) may need to be atomic operations such as compare-and-swap, at least for any objects which are shared, or potentially shared among multiple threads. Atomic operations are expensive on a multiprocessor, and even more expensive if they have to be emulated with software algorithms. It is possible to avoid this issue by adding per-thread or per-CPU reference counts and only accessing the global reference count when the local reference counts become or are no longer zero (or, alternatively, using a binary tree of reference counts, or even giving up deterministic destruction in exchange for not having a global reference count at all), but this adds significant memory overhead and thus tends to be only useful in special cases (it is used, for example, in the reference counting of Linux kernel modules). Update coalescing by Levanoni and Petrank can be used to eliminate all atomic operations from the write-barrier. Counters are never updated by the program threads in the course of program execution. They are only modified by the collector which executes as a single additional thread with no synchronization. This method can be used as a stop-the-world mechanism for parallel programs, and also with a concurrent reference counting collector.

Not real-time
Naive implementations of reference counting do not generally provide real-time behavior, because any pointer assignment can potentially cause a number of objects bounded only by total allocated memory size to be recursively freed while the thread is unable to perform other work. It is possible to avoid this issue by delegating the freeing of unreferenced objects to other threads, at the cost of extra overhead.

=== Escape analysis ===
Escape analysis is a compile-time technique that can convert heap allocations to stack allocations, thereby reducing the amount of garbage collection to be done. This analysis determines whether an object allocated inside a function is accessible outside of it. If a function-local allocation is found to be accessible to another function or thread, the allocation is said to "escape" and cannot be done on the stack. Otherwise, the object may be allocated directly on the stack and released when the function returns, bypassing the heap and associated memory management costs.

== Availability ==
Generally speaking, higher-level programming languages are more likely to have garbage collection as a standard feature. In some languages lacking built-in garbage collection, it can be added through a library, as with the Boehm garbage collector for C and C++.

Most functional programming languages, such as ML, Haskell, and APL, have garbage collection built in. Lisp is especially notable as both the first functional programming language and the first language to introduce garbage collection.

Other dynamic languages, such as Ruby and Julia (but not Perl 5 or PHP before version 5.3, which both use reference counting), JavaScript and ECMAScript also tend to use GC. Object-oriented programming languages such as Smalltalk, ooRexx, RPL and Java usually provide integrated garbage collection. Notable exceptions are C++ and Delphi, which have destructors.

=== BASIC ===
BASIC and Logo have often used garbage collection for variable-length data types, such as strings and lists, so as not to burden programmers with memory management details. On the Altair 8800, programs with many string variables and little string space could cause long pauses due to garbage collection. Similarly the Applesoft BASIC interpreter's garbage collection algorithm repeatedly scans the string descriptors for the string having the highest address in order to compact it toward high memory, resulting in $O(n^2)$ performance and pauses anywhere from a few seconds to a few minutes. A replacement garbage collector for Applesoft BASIC by Randy Wigginton identifies a group of strings in every pass over the heap, reducing collection time dramatically. BASIC.SYSTEM, released with ProDOS in 1983, provides a windowing garbage collector for BASIC that is many times faster.

=== C and C++ ===
C has never offered official support for garbage collection. C++ added garbage collection support in C++11 to the standard library, however this was removed in C++23 due to no compilers implementing support for the feature. The features that were part of this were related to pointer safety.

Although garbage collection support in the standard library was removed, some garbage collectors such as Boehm garbage collector (for C and C++) can still be used. Boehm GC uses tracing garbage collection. It can also be used in leak detection mode, where memory management is still manual however leaks and double-free errors can be detected and reported. Its use can be called from the header <gc.h>.

One can still abstract away manual object destructions in C++ by using the "resource acquisition is initialization" (RAII) idiom and smart pointers. std::unique_ptr ties lifetimes to ownership, while std::shared_ptr uses reference counting to determine lifetime. std::weak_ptr can be used to obtain a pointer without increasing the reference count. Unlike garbage collection, RAII is deterministic.

=== Objective-C ===
While the Objective-C traditionally had no garbage collection, with the release of OS X 10.5 in 2007 Apple introduced garbage collection for Objective-C 2.0, using an in-house developed runtime collector. However, with the 2012 release of OS X 10.8, garbage collection was deprecated in favor of LLVM's automatic reference counter (ARC) that was introduced with OS X 10.7. Furthermore, since May 2015 Apple even forbade the usage of garbage collection for new OS X applications in the App Store. For iOS, garbage collection has never been introduced due to problems in application responsivity and performance; instead, iOS uses ARC.

=== Limited environments ===
Garbage collection is rarely used on embedded or real-time systems because of the usual need for very tight control over the use of limited resources. However, garbage collectors compatible with many limited environments have been developed. The Microsoft .NET Micro Framework, .NET nanoFramework and Java Platform, Micro Edition are embedded software platforms that, like their larger cousins, include garbage collection.

=== Java ===
Garbage collectors available in Java OpenJDKs virtual machine (JVM) include:

- Serial
- Parallel
- CMS (Concurrent Mark Sweep)
- G1 (Garbage-First)
- ZGC (Z Garbage Collector)
- Epsilon
- Shenandoah
- GenZGC (Generational ZGC)
- GenShen (Generational Shenandoah)
- IBM Metronome (only in IBM OpenJDK)
- SAP (only in SAP OpenJDK)
- Azul C4 (Continuously Concurrent Compacting Collector) (only in Azul Systems OpenJDK)

=== Compile-time use ===
Compile-time garbage collection is a form of static analysis allowing memory to be reused and reclaimed based on invariants known during compilation.

This form of garbage collection has been studied in the Mercury programming language, and it saw greater usage with the introduction of LLVM's automatic reference counter (ARC) into Apple's ecosystem (iOS and OS X) in 2011.

=== Real-time systems ===
Incremental, concurrent, and real-time garbage collectors have been developed, for example by Henry Baker and by Henry Lieberman.

In Baker's algorithm, the allocation is done in either half of a single region of memory. When it becomes half full, a garbage collection is performed which moves the live objects into the other half and the remaining objects are implicitly deallocated. The running program (the 'mutator') has to check that any object it references is in the correct half, and if not move it across, while a background task is finding all of the objects.

Generational garbage collection schemes are based on the empirical observation that most objects die young. In generational garbage collection, two or more allocation regions (generations) are kept, which are kept separate based on the object's age. New objects are created in the "young" generation that is regularly collected, and when a generation is full, the objects that are still referenced from older regions are copied into the next oldest generation. Occasionally a full scan is performed.

Some high-level language computer architectures include hardware support for real-time garbage collection.

Most implementations of real-time garbage collectors use tracing. Such real-time garbage collectors meet hard real-time constraints when used with a real-time operating system.

== See also ==
- Destructor (computer programming)
- Dynamic dead-code elimination
- Smart pointer
- Virtual memory compression
- Garbage collection (SSD)
- Hardware-assisted garbage collection
