= Copy constructor (C++) =

Constructor that copies the state of another object

In the C++ programming language, a copy constructor is a special constructor for creating a new object as a copy of an existing object. Copy constructors are the standard way of copying objects in C++, as opposed to cloning, and have C++-specific nuances.

The first argument of such a constructor is a reference to an object of the same type as is being constructed (const or non-const), which might be followed by parameters of any type (all having default values).

Normally the compiler automatically creates a copy constructor for each class (known as an implicit copy constructor) but for special cases the programmer creates the copy constructor, known as a user-defined copy constructor. In such cases, the compiler does not create one. Hence, there is always one copy constructor that is either defined by the user or by the system.

A user-defined copy constructor is generally needed when an object owns pointers or non-shareable references, such as to a file, in which case a destructor and an assignment operator should also be written (see Rule of three).

== Definition ==
Copying of objects is achieved by the use of a copy constructor and an assignment operator. A copy constructor has as its first parameter a (possibly const or volatile) reference to its own class type. It can have more arguments, but the rest must have default values associated with them. The following would be valid copy constructors for class X:

X(const X& copy_from_me);
X(X& copy_from_me);
X(volatile X& copy_from_me);
X(const volatile X& copy_from_me);
X(X& copy_from_me, int = 0);
X(const X& copy_from_me, double = 1.0, int = 42);
...

The first one should be used unless there is a good reason to use one of the others. One of the differences between the first and the second is that temporaries can be copied with the first. For example:

X a = X();     // valid given X(const X& copy_from_me) but not valid given X(X& copy_from_me)
               // because the second wants a non-const X&
               // to create a, the compiler first creates a temporary by invoking the default constructor
               // of X, then uses the copy constructor to initialize as a copy of that temporary. 
               // Temporary objects created during program execution are always of const type. So, const keyword is required.
               // For some compilers both versions actually work but this behaviour should not be relied 
               // upon because it's non-standard.

A similar difference applies when directly attempting to copy a const object:

const X a;
X b = a;       // valid given X(const X& copy_from_me) but not valid given X(X& copy_from_me)
               // because the second wants a non-const X&

The X& form of the copy constructor is used when it is necessary to modify the copied object. This is very rare but it can be seen used in the standard library's std::auto_ptr. A reference must be provided:

X a;
X b = a;       // valid if any of the copy constructors are defined
               // since a reference is being passed.

The following are invalid copy constructors because copy_from_me is not passed as reference (&) :

X(X copy_from_me);
X(const X copy_from_me);

because the call to those constructors would require a copy as well, which would result in an infinitely recursive call.

The following cases may result in a call to a copy constructor:

1. When an object is returned by value
2. When an object is passed (to a function) by value as an argument
3. When an object is thrown
4. When an object is caught by value
5. When an object is placed in a brace-enclosed initializer list

These cases are collectively called copy-initialization and are equivalent to: T x = a;

It is however, not guaranteed that a copy constructor will be called in these cases, because the C++ Standard allows the compiler to optimize the copy away in certain cases, one example being the return value optimization (sometimes referred to as RVO).

== Operation ==
An object can be assigned value using one of the two techniques:

- Explicit assignment in an expression
- Initialization

=== Explicit assignment in an expression ===
Object a;
Object b;
a = b;       // translates as Object::operator=(const Object&), thus a.operator=(b) is called 
             // (invoke simple copy, not copy constructor!)

=== Initialization ===
An object can be initialized by any one of the following ways.

1. Through declaration: Object b = a; is translates as Object::Object(const Object&) (invoke copy constructor)
2. Through function arguments: type function(Object a);
3. Through function return value: Object a = function();

The copy constructor is used only for initializations, and does not apply to assignments where the assignment operator is used instead.

The implicit copy constructor of a class calls base copy constructors and copies its members by means appropriate to their type. If it is a class type, the copy constructor is called. If it is a scalar type, the built-in assignment operator is used. Finally, if it is an array, each element is copied in the manner appropriate to its type.

By using a user-defined copy constructor the programmer can define the behavior to be performed when an object is copied.

== Examples ==
These examples illustrate how copy constructors work and why they are sometimes required.

=== Implicit copy constructor ===

Consider the following example:

import std;

struct Person {
    int age;

    explicit Person(int age): 
        age(age) {}
};

int main() {
    Person timmy(10);
    Person sally(15);

    Person timmy_clone = timmy;
    std::println("Timmy age: {}, Sally age: {}, Timmy clone age: {}", timmy.age, sally.age, timmy_clone.age);
    timmy.age = 23;
    std::println("Timmy age: {}, Sally age: {}, Timmy clone age: {}", timmy.age, sally.age, timmy_clone.age);
}

Output

10 15 10
23 15 10

As expected, timmy has been copied to the new object, timmy_clone. While timmy's age was changed, timmy_clone's age remained the same. This is because they are totally different objects.

The compiler has generated a copy constructor for us, and it could be written like this:

Person(const Person& other): 
    age{other.age} /* Calls the copy constructor of the age. */ {}

=== User-defined copy constructor ===
Consider a very simple dynamic array class like the following:

import std;

class IntArray {
    std::size_t size;
    int* data;
public:
    explicit IntArray(int size): 
        size{size}, data{new int[size]} {}

    ~IntArray() {
        if (data) {
            delete[] data;
        }
    }

    [[nodiscard]]
    std::size_t getSize() const noexcept {
        return size;
    }

    int operator[](std::size_t index) const noexcept {
        return data[index];
    }
};

int main() {
    IntArray first(20);
    first[0] = 25;

    {
        IntArray copy = first;
        std::println("first[0] = {}, copy[0] = {}", first[0], copy[0]);
    }  // (1)

    first[0] = 10;  // (2)
}

Output

25 25
Segmentation fault

Since we did not specify a copy constructor, the compiler generated one for us. The generated constructor would look something like:

IntArray(const IntArray& other): 
    size{other.size}, data{other.data} {}

The problem with this constructor is that it performs a shallow copy of the data pointer. It only copies the address of the original data member; this means they both share a pointer to the same chunk of memory, which is not what we want. When the program reaches line (1), copy's destructor gets called (because objects on the stack are destroyed automatically when their scope ends). Array's destructor deletes the data array of the original, therefore, when it deleted copy's data, because they share the same pointer, it also deleted first's data. Line (2) now accesses invalid data and writes to it. This produces a segmentation fault.

If we write our own copy constructor that performs a deep copy then this problem goes away.

IntArray(const IntArray& other): 
    size{other.size}, data{new int[other.size]} {
    std::copy(other.data, other.data + other.size, data); 
}

Here, we are creating a new int array and copying the contents to it. Now, other's destructor deletes only its data, and not first's data. Line (2) will not produce a segmentation fault anymore.

Instead of doing a deep copy right away, there are some optimization strategies that can be used. These allow you to safely share the same data between several objects, thus saving space. The copy-on-write strategy makes a copy of the data only when it is written to. Reference counting keeps the count of how many objects are referencing the data, and will delete it only when this count reaches zero (e.g. boost::shared_ptr).

== Bitwise copy constructor ==
There is no such thing as "bitwise copy constructor" in C++. However, the default generated copy constructor copies by invoking copy constructors on members, and for a raw pointer member this will copy the raw pointer (i.e. not a deep copy).

== Logical copy constructor ==
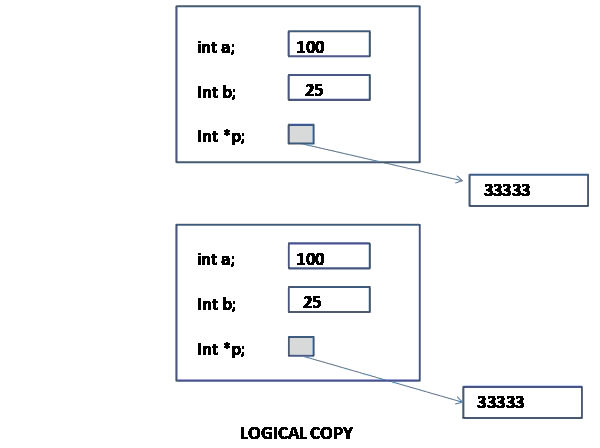
It can be seen that in a logical copy constructor, a new dynamic member variable is created for the pointer along with copying the values.

A logical copy constructor makes a true copy of the structure as well as its dynamic structures. Logical copy constructors come into the picture mainly when there are pointers or complex objects within the object being copied.

== Explicit copy constructor ==
An explicit copy constructor is one that is declared explicit by using the explicit keyword. For example:

explicit X(const X& copy_from_me);

It is used to prevent copying of objects at function calls or with the copy-initialization syntax.

== See also ==
- Assignment operator in C++
- Object copying
- Rule of three (C++ programming)
