= Comparison of programming languages (object-oriented programming) =

This comparison of programming languages compares how object-oriented programming languages such as C++, Java, Smalltalk, Object Pascal, Perl, Python, and others manipulate data structures.

== Object construction and destruction ==
	construction	destruction
ABAP Objects	data variable type ref to class . create object variable «exporting parameter = argument».	
APL (Dyalog)	variable←⎕NEW class «parameters»	⎕EX 'variable'
C++	class variable«(parameters)»; or class* variable = new class«(parameters)»;	delete pointer;
C#	class variable = new class(parameters);	variable.Dispose();
Java	class variable = new class(parameters);	
D	class variable = new class(parameters);	destroy(variable);
eC	class «instance handle» { «properties/data members assignments, instance method overrides» }	delete instance handle;
Objective-C (Cocoa)	class *variable = [[class alloc ] init]; or class *variable = [[class alloc ] initWithFoo:parameter «bar:parameter ...»];	[variable release];
Swift	let variable = class(parameters)	
Python	variable = class(parameters)	del variable (Normally not needed)
Visual Basic .NET	Dim variable As New class(parameters)	variable.Dispose()
Xojo	Dim variable As New class(parameters)	variable = Nil
Eiffel	create variable or create «{TYPE}» variable.make_foo «(parameters)» or variable := create {TYPE} or variable := create {TYPE}.make_foo «(parameters)»	
PHP	$variable = new class«(parameters)»;	unset($variable);
Perl 5	«my »$variable = class->new«(parameters)»;	undef($variable);
Raku	«my »$variable = class.new«(parameters)»;	$variable.undefine;
Ruby	variable = class.new«(parameters)»	
Windows PowerShell	$variable = New-Object «-TypeName» class ««-ArgumentList» parameters»	Remove-Variable «-Name» variable
OCaml	let variable = new class «parameters» or let variable = object members end	
F#	let variable = «new »class(«parameters»)	
Smalltalk	The class is an Object. Just send a message to a class, usually #new or #new:, and many others, for example: Point x: 10 y: 20. Array with: -1 with: 3 with: 2.	
JavaScript	var variable = new class«(parameters)» or var variable = { «key1: value1«, key2: value2 ...»»}	
Object Pascal (Delphi)	ClassVar := ClassType.ConstructorName(parameters);	ClassVar.Free;
Scala	val obj = new Object // no parameters val obj = new Object(arg0, arg1, arg2...) val obj = Object(arg0, arg1, arg2...) // case class val obj = new Object(arg0, arg1, param1 = value1, ...) // named parameters	
COBOL	INVOKE class "NEW" RETURNING variable or MOVE class::"NEW" TO variable	
Cobra	variable «as class» = class(parameters)	variable.dispose
ISLISP	(setq variable (create (class <some-class> [:field-1 value-1 [:field-2 value-2] ..])))	

== Class declaration ==
	class	protocol	namespace
ABAP Objects	class name definition «inheriting from parentclass». «interfaces: interfaces.» method_and_field_declarations endclass. class name implementation. method_implementations endclass.	interface name. members endinterface.	—N/a
APL (Dyalog)	:Class name «:parentclass» «,interfaces» members :EndClass	:Interface name members :EndInterface	:Namespace name members :EndNamespace
C++	class name« : public parentclasses» { members };		namespace name { members }
C#	class name« : «parentclass»«, interfaces»» { members }	interface name« : parentinterfaces» { members }	namespace name { members }
D	class name« : «parentclass»«, interfaces»» { members }	interface name« : parentinterfaces» { members }	module name; members
eC	class name« : base class» { «default member values assignments» «members» }		namespace name;
Java	class name« extends parentclass»« implements interfaces» { members }	interface name« extends parentinterfaces» { members }	package name; members
PHP	class name« extends parentclass»« implements interfaces» { members }	interface name« extends parentinterfaces» { members }	namespace name; members
Objective-C	@interface name« : parentclass»«< protocols >» { instance_fields } method_and_property_declarations @end @implementation name method_implementations @end	@protocol name«< parentprotocols >» members @end	
Swift	class name« : «parentclass»«, protocols»» { members }	protocol name« : parentprotocols» { members }	
Python	class name«(parentclasses)»: Tab ↹ members		__all__ = [ member1,member2,... ]
Visual Basic .NET	Class name« Inherits parentclass»« Implements interfaces» members End Class	Interface name« Inherits parentinterfaces» members End Interface	Namespace name members End Namespace
Xojo	Class name« Inherits parentclass»« Implements interfaces» members End Class	Interface name« Inherits parentinterfaces» members End Interface	Module name members End Module
Eiffel	class name« inherit parentclasses» members end	—N/a	
Perl	package name; «@ISA = qw(parentclasses);» members 1;		package name; members
Raku	class name «is parentclass «is parentclass ...»» «does role «does role ...»» { members }	role name «does role «does role ...»» { members }	module name { members }
Ruby	class name« < parentclass» members end		module name members end
Windows PowerShell	—N/a		
OCaml	class name «parameters» = object «(self)» «inherit parentclass «parameters» «inherit parentclass «parameters» ...»» members end		module name members
F#	type name«(parameters)» «as this» = class «inherit parentclass«(parameters)» «as base»» members «interface interface with implementation «interface interface with implementation ...»» end	type name = interface members end	namespace name members
Smalltalk			
JavaScript (ES6)	class name «extends parentclass» { members }		
Object Pascal (Delphi)	ClassName = Class «(ClassParent, Interfaces)» private // Private members(include Methods and Fields) public // Public members protected // Protected members published // Published members end;		package name; members
Scala	class ConcreteClass(constructor params) extends ParentClass with Trait1 with Trait2 with Trait2 { // members }	trait TraitName extends OtherTrait1 with OtherTrait2 with OtherTrait3 { // members }	package name
COBOL	CLASS-ID. name« INHERITS« FROM» parentclasses». FACTORY« IMPLEMENTS interfaces». class-members END FACTORY. OBJECT« IMPLEMENTS interfaces». instance-members END OBJECT. END CLASS name.	INTERFACE-ID. name« INHERITS« FROM» interfaces». members END INTERFACE name.	—N/a
Cobra	class name «inherits parentclass» «implements interfaces» Tab ↹ members	interface name «inherits parentinterfaces» Tab ↹ members	namespace name Tab ↹ members
ISLISP	(defclass name (base-class) ((x :initform 0 :accessor get-x :initarg x)) (:abstractp nil))		

== Class members ==
=== Constructors and destructors ===
	constructor	destructor	finalizer
ABAP Objects	methods constructor «importing parameter = argument» method constructor. instructions endmethod.	—N/a	
APL (Dyalog)	∇ name :Implements Constructor «:Base «expr»» instructions ∇		∇ name :Implements Destructor instructions ∇
C++	class(«parameters») «: initializers» { instructions }	~class() { instructions }	
C#	class(«parameters») { instructions }	void Dispose(){ instructions }	~class() { instructions }
D	this(«parameters») { instructions }		~this() { instructions }
eC	class() { instructions }	~class() { instructions }	
Java	class(«parameters») { instructions }		void finalize() { instructions }
Eiffel			
Objective-C (Cocoa)	(id)init { instructions... return self; } or; (id)initWithFoo:parameter «bar:parameter ...» { instructions... return self; }	(void)dealloc { instructions }	(void)finalize { instructions }
Swift	init(«parameters») { instructions }	deinit { instructions }	
Python	def __init__(self«, parameters»): Tab ↹ instructions		def __del__(self): Tab ↹ instructions
Visual Basic .NET	Sub New(«parameters») instructions End Sub	Sub Dispose() instructions End Sub	Overrides Sub Finalize() instructions End Sub
Xojo	Sub Constructor(«parameters») instructions End Sub	Sub Destructor() instructions End Sub	
PHP	function __construct(«parameters») { instructions }	function __destruct() { instructions }	
Perl	sub new { my ($class«, parameters») = @_; my $self = {}; instructions ... bless($self, $class); return $self; }	sub DESTROY { my ($self) = @_; instructions }	
Raku	submethod BUILD { instructions } or «multi » method new(««$self: »parameters») { self.bless(*, field1 => value1, ...); ... instructions }	submethod DESTROY { instructions }	
Ruby	def initialize«(parameters)» instructions end	—N/a	
Windows PowerShell	—N/a		
OCaml	initializer instructions	—N/a	
F#	do instructions or new(parameters) = expression	member this.Dispose() = instructions	override this.Finalize() = instructions
JavaScript	function name(«parameters») { instructions }	—N/a	
JavaScript (ES6)	constructor(«parameters») { instructions }		
COBOL	—N/a	—N/a	
Cobra	cue init(parameters); Tab ↹ base.init Tab ↹ instructions	def dispose Tab ↹ instructions	
ISLISP	(defmethod initialize-object ((instance <class-name>) initvalues)		

=== Fields ===
	public	private	protected	friend
ABAP Objects	public section. data field type type.	private section. data field type type.	protected section. data field type type.	
APL (Dyalog)	:Field Public field «← value»	:Field «Private» field «← value»		
C++	public: type field;	private: type field;	protected: type field;	
C#	public type field «= value»;	private type field «= value»;	protected type field «= value»;	internal type field «= value»;
D	public type field «= value»;	private type field «= value»;		package type field «= value»;
Java	public type field «= value»;	private type field «= value»;	protected type field «= value»;	type field «= value»;
eC	public type field;	private type field;		
Eiffel	feature field: TYPE	feature {NONE} field: TYPE	feature {current_class} field: TYPE	feature {FRIEND} field: TYPE
Objective-C	@public type field;	@private type field;	@protected type field;	@package type field;
Swift	—N/a			
Smalltalk	—N/a			—N/a
Python	self.field = value	—N/a	—N/a	
Visual Basic .NET	Public field As type «= value»	Private field As type «= value»	Protected field As type «= value»	Friend field As type «= value»
Xojo	Public field As type «= value»	Private field As type «= value»	Protected field As type «= value»	—N/a
PHP	public $field «= value»;	private $field «= value»;	protected $field «= value»;	
Perl	$self->{field} = value;	—N/a		
Raku	has« type »$.field« is rw»	has« type »$!field	—N/a	
Ruby	—N/a		@field = value	
Windows PowerShell	Add-Member «-MemberType »NoteProperty «-Name »Bar «-Value »value -InputObject variable	—N/a		
OCaml	—N/a		val «mutable» field = value	—N/a
F#	—N/a	let «mutable» field = value	—N/a	—N/a
JavaScript	this.field = value this["field"] = value			
COBOL	—N/a	level-number field clauses.	—N/a	—N/a
Cobra	var field «as type» «= value»	var __field «as type» «= value»	var _field «as type» «= value»	
ISLISP	(field :initform value :accessor accessor-name :initarg keyword)			

=== Methods ===
	basic/void method	value-returning method
ABAP Objects	methods name «importing parameter = argument» «exporting parameter = argument» «changing parameter = argument» «returning value(parameter)» method name. instructions endmethod.	
APL (Dyalog)	∇ «left argument» name «right arguments» instructions ∇	∇ result ← «left argument» name «right arguments» instructions ∇
C++ type foo(«parameters»); The implementation of methods is usually provided in a separate source file, with the following syntax type class::foo(«parameters») { instructions }	void foo(«parameters») { instructions }	type foo(«parameters») { instructions ... return value; }
C#	void foo(«parameters») { instructions }	type foo(«parameters») { instructions ... return value; }
D	void foo(«parameters») { instructions }	type foo(«parameters») { instructions ... return value; }
Java	void foo(«parameters») { instructions }	type foo(«parameters») { instructions ... return value; }
eC	void ««type of 'this'»::»foo(«parameters») { instructions }	type ««type of this»::»foo(«parameters») { instructions ... return value; }
Eiffel	foo ( «parameters» ) do instructions end	foo ( «parameters» ): TYPE do instructions... Result := value end
Objective-C	(void)foo«:parameter «bar:parameter ...»» { instructions }	(type)foo«:parameter «bar:parameter ...»» { instructions... return value; }
Swift	func foo(«parameters») { instructions }	func foo(«parameters») -> type { instructions... return value }
Python	def foo(self«, parameters»): Tab ↹ instructions	def foo(self«, parameters»): Tab ↹ instructions Tab ↹ return value
Visual Basic .NET	Sub Foo(«parameters») instructions End Sub	Function Foo(«parameters») As type instructions... Return value End Function
Xojo	Sub Foo(«parameters») instructions End Sub	Function Foo(«parameters») As type instructions... Return value End Function
PHP	function foo(«parameters»)«: void» { instructions }	function foo(«parameters»)«: type» { instructions ... return value; }
Perl	sub foo { my ($self«, parameters») = @_; instructions }	sub foo { my ($self«, parameters») = @_; instructions ... return value; }
Raku	«has »«multi »method foo(««$self: »parameters») { instructions }	«has «type »»«multi »method foo(««$self: »parameters») { instructions ... return value; }
Ruby	def foo«(parameters)» instructions end	def foo«(parameters)» instructions expression resulting in return value end or def foo«(parameters)» instructions return value end
Windows PowerShell	Add-Member «-MemberType» ScriptMethod «-Name» foo «-Value» { «param(parameters)» instructions } -InputObject variable	Add-Member «-MemberType» ScriptMethod «-Name» foo «-Value» { «param(parameters)» instructions ... return value } -InputObject variable
OCaml	—N/a	method foo «parameters» = expression
F#	—N/a	member this.foo(«parameters») = expression
JavaScript	this.method = function(«parameters») {instructions} name«.prototype.method = function(«parameters») {instructions}	this.method = function(«parameters») {instructions... return value;} name«.prototype.method = function(«parameters») {instructions... return value;}
Javascript (ES6)	foo(«parameters») {instructions}	foo(«parameters») {instructions... return value;}
COBOL	METHOD-ID. foo. «DATA DIVISION. LINKAGE SECTION. parameter declarations» PROCEDURE DIVISION« USING parameters». instructions END METHOD foo.	METHOD-ID. foo. DATA DIVISION. LINKAGE SECTION. «parameter declarations» result-var declaration PROCEDURE DIVISION« USING parameters» RETURNING result-var. instructions END METHOD foo.
Cobra	def foo(parameters); Tab ↹ instructions	def foo(parameters) as type Tab ↹ instructions Tab ↹ return value
ISLISP	(defgeneric method (arg1 arg2)) (defmethod method ((arg1 <class1> arg2 <class2>) ...)	

=== Properties ===
How to declare a property named "Bar"

==== Manually implemented ====
	read-write	read-only	write-only
ABAP Objects	—N/a		
APL (Dyalog)	:Property Bar ∇ result ← Get instructions ∇ ∇ Set arguments instructions ∇ :EndProperty Bar	:Property Bar ∇ result ← Get instructions ∇ :EndProperty Bar	:Property Bar ∇ Set arguments instructions ∇ :EndProperty Bar
C++	—N/a		
C#	type Bar { get { instructions ... return value; } set { instructions } }	type Bar { get { instructions ... return value; } }	type Bar { set { instructions } }
D	@property type bar() { instructions ... return value; } @property type bar(type value) { instructions ... return value; }	@property type bar() { instructions ... return value; }	@property type bar(type value) { instructions ... return value; }
eC	property type Bar { get { instructions ... return value; } set { instructions } }	property type Bar { get { instructions ... return value; } }	property type Bar { set { instructions } }
Java	—N/a		
Objective-C 2.0 (Cocoa)	@property (readwrite) type bar; and then inside @implementation: (type)bar { instructions }; (void)setBar:(type)value { instructions }	@property (readonly) type bar; and then inside @implementation: (type)bar { instructions }	—N/a
Swift	var bar : type { get { instructions } set«(newBar)» { instructions } }	var bar : type { instructions }	—N/a
Eiffel	feature -- Access x: TYPE assign set_x feature -- Settings set_x (a_x: like x) do instructions ensure x_set: verification end		
Python	def setBar(self, value): Tab ↹ instructions def getBar(self): Tab ↹ instructions Tab ↹ return value bar = property(getBar, setBar)	def getBar(self): Tab ↹ instructions Tab ↹ return value bar = property(getBar)	def setBar(self, value): Tab ↹ instructions bar = property(fset = setBar)
Visual Basic .NET	Property Bar() As type Get instructions Return value End Get; Set (ByVal Value As type) instructions End Set; End Property	ReadOnly Property Bar() As type Get instructions Return value End Get; End Property	WriteOnly Property Bar() As type Set (ByVal Value As type) instructions End Set; End Property
Xojo	ComputedProperty Bar() As type Get instructions Return value End Get; Set (ByVal Value As type) instructions End Set; End ComputedProperty	ComputedProperty Bar() As type Get instructions Return value End Get; End ComputedProperty	ComputedProperty Bar() As type Set (value As type) instructions End Set; End ComputedProperty
PHP	function __get($property) { switch ($property) { case 'Bar' : instructions ... return value; } } function __set($property, $value) { switch ($property) { case 'Bar' : instructions } }	function __get($property) { switch ($property) { case 'Bar' : instructions ... return value; } }	function __set($property, $value) { switch ($property) { case 'Bar' : instructions } }
Perl	sub Bar { my $self = shift; if (my $Bar = shift) { # setter $self->{Bar} = $Bar; return $self; } else { # getter return $self->{Bar}; } }	sub Bar { my $self = shift; if (my $Bar = shift) { # read-only die "Bar is read-only\n"; } else { # getter return $self->{Bar}; } }	sub Bar { my $self = shift; if (my $Bar = shift) { # setter $self->{Bar} = $Bar; return $self; } else { # write-only die "Bar is write-only\n"; } }
Raku	—N/a		
Ruby	def bar instructions expression resulting in return value end def bar=(value) instructions end	def bar instructions expression resulting in return value end	def bar=(value) instructions end
Windows PowerShell	Add-Member «-MemberType »ScriptProperty «-Name »Bar «-Value »{ instructions ... return value } «-SecondValue »{ instructions } -InputObject variable	Add-Member «-MemberType »ScriptProperty «-Name »Bar «-Value »{ instructions ... return value} -InputObject variable	Add-Member «-MemberType »ScriptProperty «-Name »Bar -SecondValue { instructions } -InputObject variable
OCaml	—N/a		
F#	member this.Bar with get() = expression and set(value) = expression	member this.Bar = expression	member this.Bar with set(value) = expression
JavaScript (ES6)	get bar(«parameters») { instructions ... return value}set bar(«parameters») { instructions }	get bar(«parameters») { instructions ... return value}	set bar(«parameters») { instructions }
COBOL	METHOD-ID. GET PROPERTY bar. DATA DIVISION. LINKAGE SECTION. return-var declaration PROCEDURE DIVISION RETURNING return-var. instructions END METHOD. METHOD-ID. SET PROPERTY bar. DATA DIVISION. LINKAGE SECTION. value-var declaration PROCEDURE DIVISION USING value-var. instructions END METHOD.	METHOD-ID. GET PROPERTY bar. DATA DIVISION. LINKAGE SECTION. return-var declaration PROCEDURE DIVISION RETURNING return-var. instructions END METHOD.	METHOD-ID. SET PROPERTY bar. DATA DIVISION. LINKAGE SECTION. value-var declaration PROCEDURE DIVISION USING value-var. instructions END METHOD.
Cobra	pro bar «as type» Tab ↹ get Tab ↹Tab ↹ instructions Tab ↹Tab ↹ return value Tab ↹ set Tab ↹Tab ↹ instructions	get bar «as type» Tab ↹ instructions Tab ↹ return value	set bar «as type» Tab ↹ instructions
ISLISP	—N/a		

==== Automatically implemented ====
	read-write	read-only	write-only
ABAP Objects	—N/a		
C++	—N/a		
C#	type Bar { get; set; }	type Bar { get; private set; }	type Bar { private get; set; }
D	—N/a		
Java	—N/a		
Objective-C 2.0 (Cocoa)	@property (readwrite) type bar; and then inside @implementation @synthesize bar;	@property (readonly) type bar; and then inside @implementation @synthesize bar;	—N/a
Swift	var bar : type	let bar : type	—N/a
Eiffel			
Python	@property def bar(self): Tab ↹instructions @bar.setter def bar(self, value): Tab ↹instructions	@property def bar(self): Tab ↹instructions	bar = property() @bar.setter def bar(self, value): Tab ↹instructions
Visual Basic .NET	Property Bar As type« = initial_value» (VB 10)		
PHP			
Perl	use base qw(Class::Accessor); __PACKAGE__->mk_accessors('Bar');	use base qw(Class::Accessor); __PACKAGE__->mk_ro_accessors('Bar');	use base qw(Class::Accessor); __PACKAGE__->mk_wo_accessors('Bar');
Raku	—N/a		
Ruby	attr_accessor :bar	attr_reader :bar	attr_writer :bar
Windows PowerShell			
OCaml	—N/a		
F#	member val Bar = value with get, set		
COBOL	level-number bar clauses PROPERTY.	level-number bar clauses PROPERTY «WITH» NO SET.	level-number bar clauses PROPERTY «WITH» NO GET.
Cobra	pro bar from var «as type»	get bar from var «as type»	set bar from var «as type»

=== Overloaded operators ===
==== Standard operators ====
	unary	binary	function call
ABAP Objects	—N/a		
C++	type operator symbol () { instructions }	type operator symbol (type operand2) { instructions }	type operator () («parameters») { instructions }
C#	static type operator symbol(type operand) { instructions }	static type operator symbol(type operand1, type operand2) { instructions }	—N/a
D	type opUnary(string s)() if (s == "symbol") { instructions }	type opBinary(string s)(type operand2) if (s == "symbol") { instructions } type opBinaryRight(string s)(type operand1) if (s == "symbol") switch (s) { instructions }	type opCall(«parameters») { instructions }
Java	—N/a		
Objective-C	—N/a		
Swift	func symbol(operand1 : type) -> returntype { instructions } (outside class)	func symbol(operand1 : type1, operand2 : type2) -> returntype { instructions } (outside class)	
Eiffel	op_name alias "symbol": TYPE do instructions end	op_name alias "symbol" (operand: TYPE1): TYPE2 do instructions end	
Python	def __opname__(self): Tab ↹ instructions Tab ↹ return value	def __opname__(self, operand2): Tab ↹ instructions Tab ↹ return value	def __call__(self«, parameters»): Tab ↹ instructions Tab ↹ return value
Visual Basic .NET	Shared Operator symbol(operand As type) As type instructions End Operator	Shared Operator symbol(operand1 As type, operand2 As type) As type instructions End Operator	—N/a
Xojo	Function Operator_name(operand As type) As type instructions End Function	—N/a	
PHP			function __invoke(«parameters») { instructions } (PHP 5.3+)
Perl	use overload "symbol" => sub { my ($self) = @_; instructions };	use overload "symbol" => sub { my ($self, $operand2, $operands_reversed) = @_; instructions };	
Raku	«our «type »»«multi »method prefix:<symbol> («$operand: ») { instructions ... return value; } or «our «type »»«multi »method postfix:<symbol> («$operand: ») { instructions ... return value; } or «our «type »»«multi »method circumfix:<symbol1 symbol2> («$operand: ») { instructions ... return value; }	«our «type »»«multi »method infix:<symbol> («$operand1: » type operand2) { instructions ... return value; }	«our «type »»«multi »method postcircumfix:<( )> («$self: » «parameters») { instructions }
Ruby	def symbol instructions expression resulting in return value end	def symbol(operand2) instructions expression resulting in return value end	—N/a
Windows PowerShell	—N/a		
OCaml	—N/a		
F#	static member (symbol) operand = expression	static member (symbol) (operand1, operand2) = expression	—N/a
COBOL	—N/a		
ISLISP	—N/a		

==== Indexers ====
	read-write	read-only	write-only
ABAP Objects	—N/a		
APL (Dyalog)	:Property Numbered Default name ∇ result ← Get instructions ∇ ∇ Set arguments instructions ∇ :EndProperty Bar	:Property Numbered Default Bar ∇ result ← Get instructions ∇ :EndProperty Bar	:Property Numbered Default Bar ∇ Set arguments instructions ∇ :EndProperty Bar
C++	type& operator[](type index) { instructions }	type operator[](type index) { instructions }	
C#	type this[type index] { get{ instructions } set{ instructions } }	type this[type index] { get{ instructions } }	type this[type index] { set{ instructions } }
D	type opIndex(type index) { instructions } type opIndexAssign(type value, type index) { instructions }	type opIndex(type index) { instructions }	type opIndexAssign(type value, type index) { instructions }
Java	—N/a		
Objective-C (recent Clang compiler)	—N/a	(id)objectAtIndexedSubscript:(NSUInteger)index { instructions return value; } or; (id)objectForKeyedSubscript:(id)index { instructions return value; }	(void)setObject:(id)value atIndexedSubscript:(NSUInteger)index { instructions } or; (void)setObject:(id)value forKeyedSubscript:(id)index { instructions }
Swift	subscript (index : type) -> returntype { get { instructions } set«(newIndex)» { instructions } }	subscript (index : type) -> returntype { instructions }	
Eiffel	bracket_name alias "[]" (index: TYPE): TYPE assign set_item do instructions end set_item (value: TYPE; index: TYPE): do instructions end	bracket_name alias "[]" (index: TYPE): TYPE do instructions end	
Python	def __getitem__(self, index): Tab ↹ instructions Tab ↹ return value def __setitem__(self, index, value): Tab ↹ instructions	def __getitem__(self, index): Tab ↹ instructions Tab ↹ return value	def __setitem__(self, index, value): Tab ↹ instructions
Visual Basic .NET	Default Property Item(Index As type) As type Get instructions End Get; Set(ByVal Value As type) instructions End Set; End Property	Default ReadOnly Property Item(Index As type) As type Get instructions End Get; End Property	Default WriteOnly Property Item(Index As type) As type Set(ByVal Value As type) instructions End Set; End Property
PHP			
Perl			
Raku	«our «type »»«multi »method postcircumfix:<[ ]> is rw («$self: » type $index) { instructions ... return value; } or «our «type »»«multi »method postcircumfix:<{ }> is rw («$self: » type $key) { instructions ... return value; }	«our «type »»«multi »method postcircumfix:<[ ]>(«$self: » type $index) { instructions ... return value; } or «our «type »»«multi »method postcircumfix:<{ }> («$self: » type $key) { instructions ... return value; }	—N/a
Ruby	def [](index) instructions expression resulting in return value end def []=(index, value) instructions end	def [](index) instructions expression resulting in return value end	def []=(index, value) instructions end
Windows PowerShell	—N/a		
OCaml	—N/a		
F#	member this.Item with get(index) = expression and set index value = expression	member this.Item with get(index) = expression	member this.Item with set index value = expression
COBOL	—N/a		
Cobra	pro[index «as type»] as type Tab ↹ get Tab ↹Tab ↹ instructions Tab ↹Tab ↹ return value Tab ↹ set Tab ↹Tab ↹ instructions	get[index «as type»] as type Tab ↹ instructions Tab ↹ return value	set[index «as type»] as type Tab ↹ instructions

==== Type casts ====
	downcast	upcast
ABAP Objects	—N/a	
C++		operator returntype() { instructions }
C#	static explicit operator returntype(type operand) { instructions }	static implicit operator returntype(type operand) { instructions }
D		T opCast(T)() if (is(T == type)) { instructions }
eC		property T { get { return «conversion code»; } }
Java	—N/a	
Objective-C	—N/a	
Eiffel	—N/a	
Python	—N/a	
Visual Basic .NET	Shared Narrowing Operator CType(operand As type) As returntype instructions End Operator	Shared Widening Operator CType(operand As type) As returntype instructions End Operator
PHP	—N/a	
Perl	—N/a	
Raku		multi method type«($self:)» is export { instructions }
Ruby	—N/a	
Windows PowerShell	—N/a	
OCaml	—N/a	
F#		
COBOL	—N/a	

== Member access ==
How to access members of an object x

	object member			class member	namespace member
	method	field	property	class member	namespace member
ABAP Objects	x->method(«parameters»).	x->field	—N/a	x=>field or x=>method(«parameters»).	—N/a
C++	x.method(parameters) or ptr->method(parameters)	x.field or ptr->field		cls::member	ns::member
Objective-C	[x method«:parameter «bar:parameter ...»»]	x->field	x.property (2.0 only) or [x property]	[cls method«:parameter «bar:parameter ...»»]	
Smalltalk	x method«:parameter «bar:parameter ...»»	—N/a		cls method«:parameter «bar:parameter ...»»	
Swift	x.method(parameters)		x.property	cls.member	
APL (Dyalog)	left argument» x.method «right argument(s)»	x.field	x.property	cls.member	ns.member
C#	x.method(parameters)	x.field		cls.member	ns.member
Java	x.method(parameters)	x.field	—N/a	cls.member	ns.member
D	x.method(parameters)	x.field	x.property	cls.member	ns.member
Python	x.method(parameters)	x.field	x.property	cls.member	ns.member
Visual Basic .NET	x.method(parameters)	x.field	x.property	cls.member	ns.member
Xojo	x.method(parameters)	x.field	x.property	cls.member	ns.member
Windows PowerShell	x.method(parameters)	x.field	x.property	[cls]::member	ns.member
F#	x.method(parameters)	—N/a	x.property	cls.member	ns.member
eC	x.method«(parameters)»	x.field	x.property	cls::member	ns::member
Eiffel	x.method«(parameters)»	x.field		{cls}.member	—N/a
Ruby	x.method«(parameters)»	—N/a	x.property	cls.member	—N/a
PHP	x->method(parameters)	x->field	x->property	cls::member	ns\member
Perl	x->method«(parameters)»	x->{field}		cls->method«(parameters)»	ns::member
Raku	x.method«(parameters)» or x!method«(parameters)»	x.field or x!field		cls.method«(parameters)» or cls!method«(parameters)»	ns::member
OCaml	x#method «parameters»	—N/a			
JavaScript	x.method(parameters) x["method"](parameters)	x.field x["field"]	x.property x["property"]	cls.member cls["member"]	—N/a
COBOL	INVOKE x "method" «USING parameters» «RETURNING result» or x::"method"«(«parameters»)»	—N/a	property OF x	INVOKE cls "method" «USING parameters» «RETURNING result» or cls::"method"«(«parameters»)» or property OF cls	—N/a
Cobra	x.method«(parameters)»	x.field	x.property	cls.member	ns.member

== Member availability ==
	Has member?		Handler for missing member	
	Method	Field	Method	Field
APL (Dyalog)	3=x.⎕NC'method'	2=x.⎕NC'method'	—N/a	
ABAP Objects	—N/a			
C++	—N/a			
Objective-C (Cocoa)	[x respondsToSelector:@selector(method)]	—N/a	forwardInvocation:	—N/a
Smalltalk	x respondsTo: selector	—N/a	doesNotUnderstand:	—N/a
C#	(using reflection)			
eC	(using reflection)			
Java	(using reflection)			
D			opDispatch()	
Eiffel	—N/a			
Python	hasattr(x, "method") and callable(x.method)	hasattr(x, "field")	__getattr__()	
Visual Basic .NET	(using reflection)			
Xojo	(using Introspection)			
Windows PowerShell	(using reflection)			
F#	(using reflection)			
Ruby	x.respond_to?(:method)	—N/a	method_missing()	—N/a
PHP	method_exists(x, "method")	property_exists(x, "field")	__call()	__get() / __set()
Perl	x->can("method")	exists x->{field}	AUTOLOAD	
Raku	x.can("method")	x.field.defined	AUTOLOAD	
OCaml	—N/a			
JavaScript	typeof x.method === "function"	field in x		
COBOL	—N/a			

== Special variables ==
	current object	current object's parent object	null reference	Current Context of Execution
Smalltalk	self	super	nil	thisContext
ABAP Objects	me	super	initial	
APL (Dyalog)	⎕THIS	⎕BASE	⎕NULL	
C++	*this		NULL, nullptr	
C#	this	base	null	
Java	this	super	null	
D	this	super	null	
JavaScript	this	super (ECMAScript 6)	null, undefined	
eC	this		null	
Objective-C	self	super	nil	
Swift	self	super	nil	
Python	self	super(current_class_name, self) super() (3.x only)	None	
Visual Basic .NET	Me	MyBase	Nothing	
Xojo	Me / Self	Parent	Nil	
Eiffel	Current	Precursor «{superclass}» «(args)»	Void	
PHP	$this	parent	null	
Perl	$self	$self->SUPER	undef	
Raku	self	SUPER	Nil	
Ruby	self	super«(args)»	nil	binding
Windows PowerShell	$this		$NULL	
OCaml	self	super	—N/a	
F#	this	base	null	
COBOL	SELF	SUPER	NULL	
Cobra	this	base	nil	

== Special methods ==
	String representation		Object copy	Value equality	Object comparison	Hash code	Object ID
	Human-readable	Source-compatible	Object copy	Value equality	Object comparison	Hash code	Object ID
ABAP Objects	—N/a						
APL (Dyalog)	⍕x	⎕SRC x	⎕NS x	x = y	—N/a		
C++				x == y			pointer to object can be converted into an integer ID
C#	x.ToString()		x.Clone()	x.Equals(y)	x.CompareTo(y)	x.GetHashCode()	System.Runtime.CompilerServices.RuntimeHelpers.GetHashCode(x)
Java	x.toString()		x.clone()	x.equals(y)	x.compareTo(y)	x.hashCode()	System.identityHashCode(x)
JavaScript	x.toString()						
D	x.toString() or std.conv.to!string(x)	x.stringof		x == y or x.opEquals(y)	x.opCmp(y)	x.toHash()	
eC	x.OnGetString(tempString, null, null) or PrintString(x)		y.OnCopy(x)		x.OnCompare(y)		object handle can be converted into an integer ID
Objective-C (Cocoa)	x.description	x.debugDescription	[x copy]	[x isEqual:y]	[x compare:y]	x.hash	pointer to object can be converted into an integer ID
Swift	x.description	x.debugDescription		x == y	x < y	x.hashValue	reflect(x).objectIdentifier!.uintValue()
Smalltalk	x displayString	x printString	x copy	x = y		x hash	x identityHash
Python	str(x)	repr(x)	copy.copy(x)	x == y	cmp(x, y)	hash(x)	id(x)
Visual Basic .NET	x.ToString()		x.Clone()	x.Equals(y)	x.CompareTo(y)	x.GetHashCode()	
Eiffel	x.out		x.twin	x.is_equal(y)	When x is COMPARABLE, one can simply do x < y	When x is HASHABLE, one can use x.hash_code	When x is IDENTIFIED, one can use x.object_id
PHP	$x->__toString()		clone x	x == y			spl_object_hash(x)
Perl	"$x"	Data::Dumper->Dump([$x],['x'])	Storable::dclone($x)				Scalar::Util::refaddr( $x )
Raku	~x	x.perl	x.clone	x eqv y	x cmp y		x.WHICH
Ruby	x.to_s	x.inspect	x.dup or x.clone	x == y or x.eql?(y)	x <=> y	x.hash	x.object_id
Windows PowerShell	x.ToString()		x.Clone()	x.Equals(y)	x.CompareTo(y)	x.GetHashCode()	
OCaml			Oo.copy x	x = y		Hashtbl.hash x	Oo.id x
F#	string x or x.ToString() or sprintf "%O" x	sprintf "%A" x	x.Clone()	x = y or x.Equals(y)	compare x y or x.CompareTo(y)	hash x or x.GetHashCode()	
COBOL	—N/a						

== Type manipulation ==
	Get object type	Is instance of (includes subtypes)	Upcasting	Downcasting	
	Get object type	Is instance of (includes subtypes)	Upcasting	Runtime check	No check
ABAP Objects	—N/a		=	?=	
C++	typeid(x)	dynamic_cast<type *>(&x) != nullptr	—N/a	dynamic_cast<type*>(ptr)	(type*) ptr or static_cast<type*>(ptr)
C#	x.GetType()	x is type	—N/a	(type) x or x as type	
D	typeid(x)		—N/a	cast(type) x	
Delphi		x is type	—N/a	x as type	
eC	x._class	eClass_IsDerived(x._class, type)	—N/a		(type) x
Java	x.getClass()	x instanceof class	—N/a	(type) x	
Objective-C (Cocoa)	[x class]	[x isKindOfClass:[class class]]	—N/a		(type*) x
Swift	x.dynamicType	x is type	—N/a	x as! type x as? type	
JavaScript	x.constructor (If not rewritten.)	x instanceof class	—N/a		
Visual Basic .NET	x.GetType()	TypeOf x Is type	—N/a	CType(x, type) or TryCast(x, type)	
Xojo	Introspection.GetType(x)	x IsA type	—N/a	CType(x, type)	—N/a
Eiffel	x.generating_type	attached {TYPE} x	attached {TYPE} x as down_x		
Python	type(x)	isinstance(x, type)	—N/a		
PHP	get_class(x)	x instanceof class	—N/a		
Perl	ref(x)	x->isa("class")	—N/a		
Raku	x.WHAT	x.isa(class)	—N/a	type(x) or x.type	
Ruby	x.class	x.instance_of?(type) or x.kind_of?(type)	—N/a		
Smalltalk	x class	x isKindOf: class	—N/a		
Windows PowerShell	x.GetType()	x -is [type]	—N/a	[type]x or x -as [type]	
OCaml	—N/a		(x :> type)	—N/a	
F#	x.GetType()	x :? type	(x :> type)	(x :?> type)	
COBOL	—N/a		x AS type	—N/a	

== Namespace management ==
	Import namespace		Import item
	qualified	unqualified	Import item
ABAP Objects			
C++		using namespace ns;	using ns::item ;
C#		using ns;	using item = ns.item;
D		import ns;	import ns : item;
Java		import ns.*;	import ns.item;
Objective-C			
Visual Basic .NET		Imports ns	
Eiffel			
Python	import ns	from ns import *	from ns import item
PHP		use ns;	use ns\item;
Perl	use ns;		use ns qw(item);
Raku	use ns;		
Ruby			
Windows PowerShell			
OCaml		open ns	
F#		open ns	
COBOL	—N/a		

== Contracts ==
	Precondition	Postcondition	Check	Invariant	Loop
ABAP Objects	—N/a				
C++	—N/a				
C#	Spec#: type foo( «parameters» ) requires expression { body }	Spec#: type foo( «parameters» ) ensures expression { body }			
Java	—N/a				
Objective-C	—N/a				
Visual Basic .NET	—N/a				
D	f in { asserts } body{ instructions }	f out (result) { asserts } body{ instructions }	assert(expression)	invariant() { expression }	
Eiffel	f require tag: expression do end	f do ensure tag: expression end	f do check tag: expression end end	class X invariant tag: expression end	from instructions invariant tag: expression until expr loop instructions variant tag: expression end
Python	—N/a				
PHP	—N/a				
Perl	—N/a				
Raku	PRE { condition }	POST { condition }			
Ruby	—N/a				
Windows PowerShell	—N/a				
OCaml	—N/a				
F#	—N/a				
COBOL	—N/a				

== See also ==
- Object-oriented programming
