= Assignment operator (C++) =

Operator (=) used for assigning values in C++

In the C++ programming language, the assignment operator, =, is the operator used for assignment. Like most other operators in C++, it can be overloaded.

The copy assignment operator, often just called the "assignment operator", is a special case of assignment operator where the source (right-hand side) and destination (left-hand side) are of the same class type. It is one of the special member functions, which means that a default version of it is generated automatically by the compiler if the programmer does not declare one. The default version performs a memberwise copy, where each member is copied by its own copy assignment operator (which may also be programmer-declared or compiler-generated).

The copy assignment operator differs from the copy constructor in that it must clean up the data members of the assignment's target (and correctly handle self-assignment) whereas the copy constructor assigns values to uninitialized data members.

For example, consider some type X:

X first; // initialization by default constructor
X second(first); // initialization by copy constructor
X third = first; // Also initialization by copy constructor
second = third; // assignment by copy assignment operator

The usual signatures of the assignment operators are, for a class X:

// Copy assignment operator
X& operator=(const X& other);

// Move assignment operator
X& operator=(X&& other) noexcept;

== Return value of overloaded assignment operator ==
The language permits an overloaded assignment operator to have an arbitrary return type (including void). However, the operator is usually defined to return a reference to the assignee. This is consistent with the behavior of assignment operator for built-in types (returning the assigned value) and allows for using the operator invocation as an expression, for instance in control statements or in chained assignment. Also, the C++ Standard Library requires this behavior for some user-supplied types.

== Overloading copy assignment operator ==
When deep copies of objects have to be made, exception safety should be taken into consideration. One way to achieve this when resource deallocation never fails is:

1. Acquire new resources
2. Release old resources
3. Assign the new resources' handles to the object

import std;

class IntArray {
private:
    int* contents;
    int count;
public:
    IntArray& operator=(const IntArray& other) {
        if (this != &other) { // protect against invalid self-assignment
            // 1: allocate new memory and copy the elements
            int* newContents = new int[other.length];
            std::ranges::copy(other.contents, newContents);

            // 2: deallocate old memory
            delete[] contents;

            // 3: assign the new memory to the object
            contents = newContents;
            length = other.length;
        }
        // by convention, always return *this
        return *this;
    }
    // ...
};

However, if a no-fail (noexcept) swap function is available for all the member subobjects and the class provides a copy constructor and destructor (which it should do according to the rule of three), the most straightforward way to implement copy assignment is as follows:

// the swap member function (should never fail!)
void swap(IntArray& other) {
    // swap all the members (and base subobject, if applicable) with other
    // because of ADL the compiler will use custom swap for members if it exists before falling back to std::swap
    using std::swap;
    // falling back to std::swap
    swap(contents, other.contents);
    swap(length, other.length);
}

// note: argument passed by value!
IntArray& operator=(IntArray other) {
    // swap this with other
    swap(other);

    // by convention, always return *this
    return *this;

    // other is destroyed, releasing the memory
}

== Assignment between different classes ==
C++ supports assignment between different classes, both via implicit copy constructor and assignment operator, if the destination instance class is the ancestor of the source instance class:

// Ancestor class
struct Ancestor {
    int a;
};

// Descendant class
struct Descendant : public Ancestor {
    int b;
};

int main() {
    Descendant descendant;
    Ancestor a(descendant);
    Ancestor b(descendant);
    a = descendant;
}

Copying from Ancestor to Descendant objects, which could leave Descendant's fields uninitialized, is not permitted.

== See also ==
- Operator overloading
- Move assignment operator
- Rule of three (C++ programming)
- Operators in C and C++
