= Java bean =

Java bean may refer to:

- Java coffee, the coffee
- JavaBeans, the software
- Enterprise JavaBeans, the server software
