= Move assignment operator =

Operator used in C++

In the C++ programming language, the move assignment operator = is used for transferring a temporary object to an existing object. The move assignment operator, like most C++ operators, can be overloaded. Like the copy assignment operator it is a special member function.

If the move assignment operator is not explicitly defined, the compiler generates an implicit move assignment operator (C++11 and newer) provided that copy/move constructors, copy assignment operator or destructors have not been declared. The parameter of a move assignment operator is an rvalue reference (T&&) to type T, where T is the object that defines the move assignment operator. The move assignment operator is different than a move constructor because a move assignment operator is called on an existing object, while a move constructor is called on an object created by the operation. Thereafter, the other object's data is no longer valid.

== Overloading move assignment operator ==
To overload the move assignment operator, the signature of the function must be:

T& operator=(T&& data);

To successfully overload the move assignment operator, the following conditions must be met:

- Check if the object calling the operator is not calling the operator on itself.
- The current object's data is de-allocated.
- The object that is being moved from must have its data marked as nullptr (or something to signify the move)
- The operator must return a reference to *this.

Consider the following move assignment operator for a simple string class:

class MyString {
private:
    char* data_;
public:
    MyString& operator=(MyString&& other) noexcept {
        // If we're not trying to move the object into itself...
        if (this != &other) {
            delete[] this->data; // Free this string's original data.
            this->data = other.data; // Copy the other string's data pointer into this string.
            other.data = nullptr; // Finally, reset the other string's data pointer.
        }
        return *this;
    }
};
