= As if =

As if or As If may refer to:

== Music ==
- As If, the former, short-lived name of alternative rock band Our Lady Peace

=== Albums and EPs ===
- As If (album), !!!'s sixth studio album
- As If! (EP), a 2011 EP by Sky Ferreira

=== Songs ===
- "As If" (Sara Evans song), 2007
- As If (Glaive song), 2023
- "As If", a song by R&B trio Blaque from the Bring It On soundtrack
- "As If", a song by rapper Prodigy from Hegelian Dialectic

== Television ==
- As If (British TV series), a British television series
- As If (American TV series), an American television series based upon the British series of the same name
- As If (Turkish TV series) (Turkish: Gibi), a Turkish television series

== Other uses ==
- The Philosophy of 'As if', a 1911 work by German philosopher Hans Vaihinger
- Ås IF, Swedish football club
- "As if", a phrase and exemplar of Valleyspeak
- As-if rule, a rule governing translation of computer programs

== See also ==
- Asif, Arabic masculine given name
