= Nullary constructor =

In programming, an object-creating function that takes no arguments

In computer programming, a nullary constructor is a constructor that takes no arguments. Also known as a 0-argument constructor, no-argument constructor, parameterless constructor or default constructor.

== Object-oriented constructors ==
In object-oriented programming, a constructor is code that is run when an object is created. Default constructors of objects are usually nullary.

=== Java example ===
public class MyInteger {
    private int data;

    // Nullary constructor
    public MyInteger() {
        this(0);
    }

    // Non-nullary constructor
    public MyInteger(int value) {
        this.data = value;
    }

    int getData() {
        return data;
    }

    void setData(int value) {
        data = value;
    }
}

=== C++ example ===
class Integer {
private:
    int data;
public:
    // Default constructor with parameters
    // Leaving parameters unspecified defaults to the default value
    Integer(int value = 0):
        data{value} {}

    [[nodiscard]]
    int getData() const noexcept {
        return data;
    }

    void setData(int value) noexcept {
        data = value;
    }
}

== Algebraic data types ==
In algebraic data types, a constructor is one of many tags that wrap data. If a constructor does not take any data arguments, it is nullary.

=== Haskell example ===
-- nullary type constructor with two nullary data constructors
data Bool = False
          | True

-- non-nullary type constructor with one non-nullary data constructor
data Point a = Point a a

-- non-nullary type constructor with...
data Maybe a = Nothing -- ...nullary data constructor
             | Just a  -- ...unary data constructor

== See also ==
- Default constructor
