= Default constructor =

Automatic generated special function called to create an object

In computer programming languages, the term default constructor can refer to a constructor that is automatically generated by the compiler in the absence of any programmer-defined constructors (e.g. in Java), and is usually a nullary constructor. In other languages (e.g. in C++) it is a constructor that can be called without having to provide any arguments, irrespective of whether the constructor is auto-generated or user-defined. Note that a constructor with formal parameters can still be called without arguments if default arguments were provided in the constructor's definition.

== C++ ==
In C++, the standard describes the default constructor for a class as a constructor that can be called with no arguments (this includes a constructor whose parameters all have default arguments). For example:

class MyClass {
private:
    int x;
public:
    // constructor
    MyClass():
        x{100} {}
};

int main() {
    MyClass m;  // at runtime, object m is created, and the default constructor is called
}

When allocating memory dynamically, the constructor may be called by adding parenthesis after the class name. In a sense, this is an explicit call to the constructor:

int main() {
    MyClass* p = new MyClass();  // at runtime, an object is created, and the default constructor is called
    delete p;
}

If the constructor does have one or more parameters, but they all have default values, then it is still a default constructor. Remember that each class can have at most one default constructor, either one without parameters, or one whose all parameters have default values, such as in this case:

class MyClass {
private:
    int x;
    int y;
    std::string z;
public:
    // constructor
    MyClass (int i = 0, const std::string& s = ""):
        x{100}, y{i}, z{s} {}
};

In C++, default constructors are significant because they are automatically invoked in certain circumstances; and therefore, in these circumstances, it is an error for a class to not have a default constructor:

- When an object value is declared with no argument list (e.g.: MyClass x;) or allocated dynamically with no argument list (e.g.: new MyClass; or new MyClass();), the default constructor of MyClass is used to initialize the object.
- When an array of objects is declared, e.g. MyClass x[10];; or allocated dynamically, e.g. new MyClass [10]. The default constructor of MyClass is used to initialize all the elements.
- When a derived class constructor does not explicitly call the base class constructor in its initializer list, the default constructor for the base class is called.
- When a class constructor does not explicitly call the constructor of one of its object-valued fields in its initializer list, the default constructor for the field's class is called.
- In the standard library, certain containers "fill in" values using the default constructor when the value is not given explicitly. E.g. vector<MyClass>(10); initializes the vector with ten elements, which are filled with a default-constructed MyClass object.

If a class has no explicitly defined constructors, the compiler will implicitly declare and define a default constructor for it. This implicitly defined default constructor is equivalent to an explicitly defined one with an empty body. For example:

class MyClass {
    int x;  // no constructor, so the compiler produces an (implicit) default constructor
};

int main() {
    MyClass m;   // no error at runtime: the (implicit) default constructor is called
}

If constructors are explicitly defined for a class, but they are all non-default, the compiler will not implicitly define a default constructor, leading to a situation where the class does not have a default constructor. This is the reason for a typical error, demonstrated by the following example.

class MyClass {
private:
    int x;
public:
    MyClass (int y):
        x{y} {} // declaration a non-default constructor
};
int main() {
    MyClass m(100);     // the non-default constructor is called
    MyClass* p;        // for pointer declarations, the compiler does not need to know about constructors
    p = new MyClass();  // error at compilation: no default constructor
    delete p;
    return 0;
}

Since neither the programmer nor the compiler has defined a default constructor, the creation of the objected pointed to by p leads to an error.

On the other hand in C++11 a default constructor can be explicitly created:

class MyClass {
public:
    MyClass () = default;  // force generation of a default constructor
};

Or explicitly inhibited:

class MyClass {
public:
    MyClass () = delete;  // prevent generation of default constructor
};

== Java and C# ==
In both Java and C#, a "default constructor" refers to a nullary constructor that is automatically generated by the compiler if no constructors have been defined for the class. The default constructor implicitly calls the superclass's nullary constructor, then executes an empty body. All fields are left at their initial value of 0 (integer types), 0.0 (floating-point types), false (boolean type), or null (reference types). A programmer-defined constructor that takes no parameters is also called a default constructor in C#, but not in Java.

== See also ==
- Nullary constructor
