= Constructor (object-oriented programming) =

Special function called to create an object

In class-based, object-oriented programming, a constructor (abbreviation: ctor) is a special type of function called to create an object. It prepares the new object for use, often accepting arguments that the constructor uses to set required member variables.

A constructor resembles an instance method, but it differs from a method in that it has no explicit return type, it is not implicitly inherited and it usually has different rules for scope modifiers. Constructors often have the same name as the declaring class. They have the task of initializing the object's data members and of establishing the invariant of the class, failing if the invariant is invalid. A properly written constructor leaves the resulting object in a valid state. Immutable objects must be initialized in a constructor.

Most languages allow overloading the constructor in that there can be more than one constructor for a class, with differing parameters. Some languages take consideration of some special types of constructors. Constructors, which concretely use a single class to create objects and return a new instance of the class, are abstracted by factories, which also create objects but can do so in various ways, using multiple classes or different allocation schemes such as an object pool.

== Types ==
=== Parameterized constructors ===
Constructors that can take at least one argument are termed as parameterized constructors. When an object is declared in a parameterized constructor, the initial values have to be passed as arguments to the constructor function. The normal way of object declaration may not work. The constructors can be called explicitly or implicitly. The method of calling the constructor implicitly is also called the shorthand method.

class Point {
private:
    int x;
    int y;
public:
    Point() = default;
    Point(int x, int y):
        x{x}, y{y} {} // Parameterized constructor
};

Point p = Point(0, 50);  // Explicit call.
Point p2(0, 50);  // Implicit call.

=== Default constructors ===
If the programmer does not supply a constructor for an instantiable class, Java compiler inserts a default constructor into the code. This constructor is known as default constructor. It would not be found in source code (the .java file) as it would be inserted into the code during compilation and exists in .class file. The behavior of the default constructor is language dependent. It may initialize data members to zero or other same values, or it may do nothing at all. In Java, a "default constructor" refer to a nullary constructor that is automatically generated by the compiler if no constructors have been defined for the class or in the absence of any programmer-defined constructors (e.g. in Java, the default constructor implicitly calls the superclass's nullary constructor, then executes an empty body). All fields are left at their initial value of 0 (integer types), 0.0 (floating-point types), false (boolean type), or null (reference types), etc.

class Point {
private:
    int x;
    int y;
public:
    Point(int x = 0, int y = 0);  // Default constructor.
};

=== Copy constructors ===
Like C++, Java also supports "Copy Constructors". But, unlike C++, Java does not create a default copy constructor even if no such copy constructor is specified. Copy constructors define the actions performed by the compiler when copying class objects. A Copy constructor has one formal parameter that is the type of the class (the parameter may be a reference to an object). It is used to create a copy of an existing object of the same class. Even though both classes are the same, it counts as a conversion constructor. While copy constructors are usually abbreviated copy ctor or cctor, they have nothing to do with class constructors used in .NET using the same abbreviation.

=== Conversion constructors ===
Conversion constructors provide a means for a compiler to implicitly create an object belonging to one class based on an object of a different type. These constructors are usually invoked implicitly to convert arguments or operands to an appropriate type, but they may also be called explicitly.

=== Move constructors ===
In C++, move constructors take an Rvalue reference to an object of the class, and are used to implement ownership transfer of the parameter object's resources.

== Syntax ==
- Java, C++, C#, ActionScript, PHP 4, and MATLAB have a naming convention in which constructors have the same name as the class with which they are associated.
- In C and Rust (programming language), there are no language-level constructors. In C, objects are created by a struct initializer, or a function that creates such an instance of an object. Similarly in Rust, objects are created as struct literals, but may also include a constructor-like associated function (typically named new, from, etc.)
- In Crystal, similarly to Python, the constructor is split between two methods: new and initialize. The compiler defines the new method, requiring only that the user define initialize. Although the Crystal compiler automatically defines it, the user may manually define new, and even forego use of default new and define their own constructors.
- In PHP 5, a recommended name for a constructor is __construct. For backwards compatibility, a method with the same name as the class will be called if __construct method can not be found. Since PHP 5.3.3, this works only for non-namespaced classes.
- In PHP 7, you should always name the constructor as __construct. Methods with the same name as the class will trigger an E_DEPRECATED level error.
- In Perl, constructors are, by convention, named "new" and have to do a fair amount of object creation.
- In Moose object system for Perl, constructors (named new) are automatically created and are extended by specifying a BUILD method.
- In Visual Basic .NET, the constructor is called "New".
- In Python, the constructor is split over two methods, "__new__" and "__init__". The __new__ method is responsible for allocating memory for the instance, and receives the class as an argument (conventionally called "cls"). The __init__ method (often called "the initialiser") is passed the newly created instance as an argument (conventionally called "self").
- Object Pascal constructors are signified by the keyword "constructor" and can have user-defined names (but are mostly called "Create").
- In Objective-C, the constructor method is split across two methods, "alloc" and "init" with the alloc method setting aside (allocating) memory for an instance of the class, and the init method handling the bulk of initializing the instance. A call to the method "new" invokes both the alloc and the init methods, for the class instance.

== Memory organization ==
In Java, C#, and VB .NET, the constructor creates reference type objects on the heap, whereas primitive types (such as int, double, etc.) are stored on the stack (though some languages allow for manually allocating objects on the stack through a stackalloc modifier). VB .NET and C# also allow the use of the new operator to create value type objects, but these value type objects are created on the stack regardless of whether the operator is used or not. In these languages, object destruction occurs when the object has no references and then gets destroyed by the garbage collector.

In C++, objects are created on the stack when the constructor is invoked without the new operator, and created on the heap when the constructor is invoked with the new operator (which returns a pointer to the object). Stack objects are deleted implicitly when they go out of scope, while heap objects must be deleted implicitly by a destructor or explicitly by using the delete operator. By using the "Resource Acquisition is Initialization" (RAII) idiom, resource management can be greatly simplified.

== Language details ==
Constructors are implemented in different programming languages in various ways, including:

=== C ===
In C, there are no constructors. However, functions can be defined to create an object, similar to a constructor.

#include <stdlib.h>

typedef struct {
    char* name;
    int age;
} Person;

// this method creates an instance of Person
Person* createPerson(const char name[], int age) {
    Person* p = (Person*)malloc(sizeof(Person));
    if (!p) {
        return NULL;
    }
    strcpy(p->name, name);
    p->age = age;
    return p;
}

// this method destroys an instance of Person
void destroyPerson(Person* p) {
    if (p) {
        free(p->name);
        free(p);
    }
}

=== C++ ===
In C++, the name of the constructor is the name of the class. It returns nothing. It can have parameters like any member function. Constructor functions are usually declared in the public section, but can also be declared in the protected and private sections, if the user wants to restrict access to them.

The constructor has two parts. First is the initializer list which follows the parameter list and before the method body. It starts with a colon and entries are comma-separated. The initializer list is not required, but offers the opportunity to provide values for data members and avoid separate assignment statements. The initializer list is required if there are const or reference type data members, or members that do not have parameterless constructor logic. Assignments occur according to the order in which data members are declared (even if the order in the initializer list is different). The second part is the body, which is a normal method body enclosed in curly brackets. It is generally cheaper and better practice to use the initializer list as much as possible, and only use the constructor body for non-assignment operations and assignments where the initializer list cannot be used or is otherwise insufficient.

C++ allows more than one constructor. The other constructors must have different parameters. Additionally constructors which contain parameters which are given default values, must adhere to the restriction that not all parameters are given a default value. This is a situation which only matters if there is a default constructor. The constructor of a base class (or base classes) can also be called by a derived class. Constructor functions are not inherited and their addresses cannot be referenced. When memory allocation is required, the new and delete operators are called implicitly.

A copy constructor has a parameter of the same type passed as const reference, for example X(const X& rhs). If it is not provided explicitly, the compiler uses the copy constructor for each member variable or simply copies values in case of primitive types. The default implementation is not efficient if the class has dynamically allocated members (or handles to other resources), because it can lead to double calls to delete (or double release of resources) upon destruction.

import std;

class PolarPoint {
private:
    double x;
    double y;
public:
    explicit PolarPoint(double r = 1.0, double theta = 0.0):  // Constructor, parameters with default values.
        x{r * std::cos(theta)}, y{r * std::sin(theta)} /* <- Initializer list */ {
        std::println("Point: x = {}, y = {}", x, y); // Constructor body
    }
};

Example invocations:

PolarPoint a;
PolarPoint b(3);
PolarPoint c(5, std::numbers::pi / 4);

On returning objects from functions or passing objects by value, the objects copy constructor will be called implicitly, unless return value optimization applies.

C++ implicitly generates a default copy constructor which will call the copy constructors for all base classes and all member variables unless the programmer provides one, explicitly deletes the copy constructor (to prevent cloning) or one of the base classes or member variables copy constructor is deleted or not accessible (private). Most cases calling for a customized copy constructor (e.g. reference counting, deep copy of pointers) also require customizing the destructor and the copy assignment operator. This is commonly referred to as the Rule of three.

=== C# ===
Example C# constructor:

public class MyClass
{
    private int a;
    private string b;

    // Constructor
    public MyClass() : this(42, "string")
    {
    }

    // Overloading a constructor
    public MyClass(int a, string b)
    {
        this.a = a;
        this.b = b;
    }
}

// Code somewhere
// Instantiating an object with the constructor above
MyClass c = new MyClass(42, "string");

Since C# 9.0, constructor calls can be further simplified using target-typed new expressions, which do not require naming the constructor when the type is already given. It will automatically call the constructor of the named type before the variable, but obviously will not resolve if using type deduction (var).

// Above example with target-typed new expressions
MyClass c = new(42, "string");

==== C# static constructor ====
In C#, a static constructor is a static data initializer. Static constructors are also called class constructors. Since the actual method generated has the name .cctor they are often also called "cctors".

Static constructors allow complex static variable initialization. Static constructors are called implicitly when the class is first accessed. Any call to a class (static or constructor call), triggers the static constructor execution. Static constructors are thread safe and implement a singleton pattern. When used in a generic programming class, static constructors are called at every new generic instantiation one per type. Static variables are instantiated as well.

public class MyClass
{
    private static int _A;

    // Normal constructor
    static MyClass()
    {
        _A = 32;
    }

    // Standard default constructor
    public MyClass()
    {

    }
}

// Code somewhere
// Instantiating an object with the constructor above
// right before the instantiation
// The variable static constructor is executed and _A is 32
MyClass c = new MyClass();

=== ColdFusion Markup Language (CFML) ===
ColdFusion Markup Language (CFML) uses a method named 'init' as a constructor method.

Cheese.cfc

component {
   // properties
   property name="cheeseName";

   // constructor
   function Cheese init( required string cheeseName ) {
      variables.cheeseName = arguments.cheeseName;
      return this;
   }
}

Create instance of a cheese.

myCheese = new Cheese( 'Cheddar' );

Since ColdFusion 10, CFML has also supported specifying the name of the constructor method:

component initmethod="Cheese" {
   // properties
   property name="cheeseName";

   // constructor
   function Cheese Cheese( required string cheeseName ) {
      variables.cheeseName = arguments.cheeseName;
      return this;
   }
}

=== Crystal ===
In Crystal, the user defines an initialize method, which the compiler uses to define a new method for allocating memory for the object and calling the user-defined method. The user can also manually define new or define an equivalent method with a different name, if desired (the code for both initialize and new is shown here). Although this snippet defines a class, the procedure is identical for Crystal structs.

class Car
  # the initializer, which is an instance method.
  def initialize(make : String, year : Int)
    @make = make
    @year = year
  end
  # the allocator, which is a class method, denoted by the "self." prefix.
  # note that `new` takes the same arguments as `initialize`
  def self.new(make : String, year : Int)
    # allocate memory for the instance
    instance = Car.allocate
    # call the instance's initialize method using the provided parameters
    instance.initialize make, year
    # return the instance
    instance
  end
end

# instantiate a new `Car` like so:
old_car = Car.new("Chevrolet", 1947)

=== Eiffel ===
In Eiffel, the routines which initialize new objects are called creation procedures. Creation procedures have the following traits:

- Creation procedures have no explicit return type (by definition of procedure). (Note: Eiffel routines are either procedures or functions. Procedures never have a return type. Functions always have a return type.)
- Creation procedures are named.
- Creation procedures are designated by name as creation procedures in the text of the class.
- Creation procedures can be explicitly invoked to re-initialize existing objects.
- Every effective (i.e., concrete or non-abstract) class must designate at least one creation procedure.
- Creation procedures must leave the newly initialized object in a state that satisfies the class invariant. (Note: Because the inherited class invariant must be satisfied, there is no mandatory call to the parents' constructors.)

Although object creation involves some subtleties, the creation of an attribute with a typical declaration x: T as expressed in a creation instruction create x.make consists of the following sequence of steps:

- Create a new direct instance of type T. (Note: The Eiffel standard requires fields to be initialized on first access, so it is not necessary to perform default field initialization during object creation.)
- Execute the creation procedure make to the newly created instance.
- Attach the newly initialized object to the entity x.

In the first snippet below, class POINT is defined. The procedure make is coded after the keyword feature.

The keyword create introduces a list of procedures which can be used to initialize instances. In this case the list includes default_create, a procedure with an empty implementation inherited from class ANY, and the make procedure coded within the class.

class
    POINT
create
    default_create, make

feature

    make (a_x_value: REAL; a_y_value: REAL)
        do
            x := a_x_value
            y := a_y_value
        end

    x: REAL
            -- X coordinate

    y: REAL
            -- Y coordinate
        ...

In the second snippet, a class which is a client to POINT has a declarations my_point_1 and my_point_2 of type POINT.

In procedural code, my_point_1 is created as the origin (0.0, 0.0). Because no creation procedure is specified, the procedure default_create inherited from class ANY is used. This line could have been coded create my_point_1.default_create . Only procedures named as creation procedures can be used in an instruction with the create keyword. Next is a creation instruction for my_point_2, providing initial values for the my_point_2's coordinates. The third instruction makes an ordinary instance call to the make procedure to reinitialize the instance attached to my_point_2 with different values.

    my_point_1: POINT
    my_point_2: POINT
        ...

            create my_point_1
            create my_point_2.make (3.0, 4.0)
            my_point_2.make (5.0, 8.0)
        ...

=== F# ===
In F#, a constructor can include any let or do statements defined in a class. let statements define private fields and do statements execute code. Additional constructors can be defined using the new keyword.

type MyClass(_a : int, _b : string) = class
    // Primary constructor
    let a = _a
    let b = _b
    do printfn "a = %i, b = %s" a b

    // Additional constructors
    new(_a : int) = MyClass(_a, "") then
        printfn "Integer parameter given"

    new(_b : string) = MyClass(0, _b) then
        printfn "String parameter given"

    new() = MyClass(0, "") then
        printfn "No parameter given"
end

// Code somewhere
// instantiating an object with the primary constructor
let c1 = new MyClass(42, "string")

// instantiating an object with additional constructors
let c2 = new MyClass(42)
let c3 = new MyClass("string")
let c4 = MyClass() // "new" keyword is optional

=== Java ===
In Java, constructors differ from other methods in that:

- Constructors never have an explicit return type.
- Constructors cannot be directly invoked (the keyword “new” invokes them).
- Constructors should not have non-access modifiers.

Java constructors perform the following tasks in the following order:

1. Call the default constructor of the superclass if no constructor is defined.
2. Initialize member variables to the specified values.
3. Executes the body of the constructor.

Java permit users to call one constructor in another constructor using this() keyword. But this() must be first statement.

class X { 
    public X() { // Non-parameterized constructor
        this(1);  // Calling of constructor
        System.out.println("Calling default constructor");
    }

    public X(int a) { // Parameterized constructor
        System.out.println("Calling parameterized constructor");
    }
}

public class Example {
    public static void main(String[] args) {
        X x = new X();
    }
}

Java provides access to the superclass's constructor through the super keyword.

class X {
    // Declaration of instance variable(s).
    private int data;

    // Definition of the constructor.
    public X() {
        this(1);
    }

    // Overloading a constructor
    public X(int input) {
        data = input; // This is an assignment
    }
}

class Y extends X {
    private int data2;

    public Y() {
        super();
        data2 = 1;
    }

    public Y(int input1, int input2) {
        super(input1);
        data2 = input2
    }
}

public class Example {
    public static void main(String[] args) {
        Y y = new Y(42, 43);
    }
}

A constructor taking zero number of arguments is called a "no-arguments" or "no-arg" constructor.

=== JavaScript/TypeScript ===
As of ES6, JavaScript has direct constructors like many other programming languages. They are written as such

class FooBar {
    constructor(baz) {
        this.baz = baz;
    }
}

This can be instantiated as such

const foo = new FooBar('7');

The equivalent of this before ES6, was creating a function that instantiates an object as such

function FooBar (baz) {
    this.baz = baz;
}

This is instantiated the same way as above.

The TypeScript equivalent of this would be:

class FooBar {
    baz: string;

    constructor(baz: string) {
        this.baz = baz;
    }
}

const foo: FooBar = new FooBar('7');

=== Object Pascal ===
In Object Pascal, the constructor is similar to a factory method. The only syntactic difference to regular methods is the keyword constructor in front of the name (instead of procedure or function). It can have any name, though the convention is to have Create as prefix, such as in CreateWithFormatting. Creating an instance of a class works like calling a static method of a class: TPerson.Create('Peter').

program OopProgram;

type
  TPerson = class
  private
    FName: string;
  public
    property Name: string read FName;
    constructor Create(AName: string);
  end;

constructor TPerson.Create(AName: string);
begin
  FName := AName;
end;

var
  Person: TPerson;
begin
  Person := TPerson.Create('Peter'); // allocates an instance of TPerson and then calls TPerson.Create with the parameter AName = 'Peter'
end.

=== OCaml ===
In OCaml, there is one constructor. Parameters are defined right after the class name. They can be used to initialize instance variables and are accessible throughout the class. An anonymous hidden method called initializer allows to evaluate an expression immediately after the object has been built.

class person first_name last_name =
  object
    val full_name = first_name ^ " " ^ last_name

    initializer
      print_endline("Hello there, I am " ^ full_name ^ ".")

    method get_last_name = last_name
  end;;

let alonzo = new person "Alonzo" "Church" in (*Hello there, I am Alonzo Church.*)

print_endline alonzo#get_last_name (*Church*)

=== PHP ===
In PHP version 5 and above, the constructor is a method named __construct() (notice that it's a double underscore), which the keyword new automatically calls after creating the object. It is usually used to automatically perform initializations such as property initializations. Constructors can also accept arguments, in which case, when the new statement is written, you also need to send the constructor arguments for the parameters.

class Person
{
    private string $name;

    public function __construct(string $name): void
    {
        $this->name = $name;
    }

    public function getName(): string
    {
        return $this->name;
    }
}

In PHP, a class is only allowed to declare a maximum of one constructor method. Static methods, factory classes or optional constructor arguments are some ways to facilitate multiple ways to create objects of a PHP class.

=== Perl 5 ===
In Perl version 5, by default, constructors are factory methods, that is, methods that create and return the object, concretely meaning create and return a blessed reference. A typical object is a reference to a hash, though rarely references to other types are used too. By convention the only constructor is named new, though it is allowed to name it otherwise, or to have multiple constructors. For example, a Person class may have a constructor named new, and a constructor new_from_file which reads a file for Person attributes, and new_from_person which uses another Person object as a template.

package Person;
# In Perl constructors are named 'new' by convention.
sub new {
    # Class name is implicitly passed in as 0th argument.
    my $class = shift;

    # Default attribute values, if you have any.
    my %defaults = ( foo => "bar" );

    # Initialize attributes as a combination of default values and arguments passed.
    my $self = { %defaults, @_ };

    # Check for required arguments, class invariant, etc.
    if ( not defined $self->{first_name} ) {
        die "Mandatory attribute missing in Person->new(): first_name";
    }
    if ( not defined $self->{last_name} ) {
        die "Mandatory attribute missing in Person->new(): last_name";
    }
    if ( defined $self->{age} and $self->{age} < 18 ) {
        die "Invalid attribute value in Person->new(): age < 18";
    }

    # Perl makes an object belong to a class by 'bless'.
    bless $self, $class;
    return $self;
}
1;

==== Perl 5 with Moose ====
In the Moose object system for Perl, most of this boilerplate can be omitted, a default new is created, attributes can be specified, and whether they can be set, reset, or are required. In addition, any extra constructor functionality can be included in a BUILD method which the Moose generated constructor will call, after it has checked the arguments. A BUILDARGS method can be specified to handle constructor arguments not in hashref / key => value form.

package Person;
# enable Moose-style object construction
use Moose;

# first name ( a string) can only be set at construction time ('ro')
has first_name => (is => 'ro', isa => 'Str', required => 1);
# last name ( a string) can only be set at construction time ('ro')
has last_name  => (is => 'ro', isa => 'Str', required => 1);
# age (Integer) can be modified after construction ('rw'), and is not required
# to be passed to be constructor.  Also creates a 'has_age' method which returns
# true if age has been set
has age        => (is => 'rw', isa => 'Int', predicate => 'has_age');

# Check custom requirements
sub BUILD {
      my $self = shift;
      if ($self->has_age && $self->age < 18) { # no under 18s
           die "No under-18 Persons";
      }
}
1;

In both cases the Person class is instiated like this:

use Person;
my $p = Person->new( first_name => 'Sam', last_name => 'Ashe', age => 42 );

=== Python ===
In Python, constructors are defined by one or both of __new__ and __init__ methods. A new instance is created by calling the class as if it were a function, which calls the __new__ and __init__ methods. If a constructor method is not defined in the class, the next one found in the class's Method Resolution Order will be called.

In the typical case, only the __init__ method need be defined. (The most common exception is for immutable objects.)

class ExampleClass:
    def __new__(cls: type, value: int) -> 'ExampleClass':
        print("Creating new instance...")
        # Call the superclass constructor to create the instance.
        instance: 'ExampleClass' = super(ExampleClass, cls).__new__(cls)
        return instance

    def __init__(self, value: int) -> None:
        print("Initialising instance...")
        self.payload: int = value

if __name__ == "__main__":
    exampleInstance: ExampleClass = ExampleClass(42)
    print(exampleInstance.payload)

This prints:

Creating new instance...
Initialising instance...
42

Classes normally act as factories for new instances of themselves, that is, a class is a callable object (like a function), with the call being the constructor, and calling the class returns an instance of that class. However the __new__ method is permitted to return something other than an instance of the class for specialised purposes. In that case, the __init__ is not invoked.

=== Raku ===
In Raku, even more boilerplate can be omitted, given that a default new method is inherited, attributes can be specified, and whether they can be set, reset, or are required. In addition, any extra constructor functionality can be included in a BUILD method which will get called to allow for custom initialization. A TWEAK method can be specified to post-process any attributes already (implicitly) initialized.

class Person {
    has Str $.first-name is required; # First name (a string) can only be set at
                                      # construction time (the . means "public").
    has Str $.last-name is required;  # Last name (a string) can only be set at
                                      # construction time (a ! would mean "private").
    has Int $.age is rw;              # Age (an integer) can be modified after 
                                      # construction ('rw'), and is not required
                                      # during the object instantiation.
    
    # Create a 'full-name' method which returns the person's full name.
    # This method can be accessed outside the class.
    method full-name { $!first-name.tc ~ " " ~ $!last-name.tc }

    # Create a 'has-age' method which returns true if age has been set.
    # This method is used only inside the class so it's declared as "private"
    # by prepending its name with a !
    method !has-age { self.age.defined }
  
    # Check custom requirements
    method TWEAK {
        if self!has-age && $!age < 18 { # No under 18
            die "No person under 18";
        }
    }
}

The Person class is instantiated like this:

my $p0 = Person.new( first-name => 'Sam', last-name => 'Ashe', age => 42 );
my $p1 = Person.new( first-name => 'grace', last-name => 'hopper' );
say $p1.full-name(); # OUTPUT: «Grace Hopper␤»

Alternatively, the named parameters can be specified using the colon-pair syntax in Perl 6:

my $p0 = Person.new( :first-name<Sam>, :last-name<Ashe>, :age(42) );
my $p1 = Person.new( :first-name<Grace>, :last-name<Hopper> );

And should you have set up variables with names identical to the named parameters, you can use a shortcut that will use the name of the variable for the named parameter:

my $first-name = "Sam";
my $last-name  = "Ashe";
my $age        = 42;
my $p0 = Person.new( :$first-name, :$last-name, :$age );

=== Ruby ===
In Ruby, constructors are created by defining a method called initialize. This method is executed to initialize each new instance.

irb(main):001:0> class ExampleClass
irb(main):002:1>   def initialize
irb(main):003:2>     puts "Hello there"
irb(main):004:2>   end
irb(main):005:1> end
=> nil
irb(main):006:0> ExampleClass.new
Hello there
=> #<ExampleClass:0x007fb3f4299118>

=== Rust ===
Rust does not have constructors in the sense of object-oriented programming, but often structs have a new() method that essentially acts as a constructor. The return type is usually indicated as Self.

struct Point {
    x: i32,
    y: i32,
}

impl Point {
    pub fn new(x: i32, y: i32) -> Self {
        Point { x, y }
    }
}

fn main() {
    let p: Point = Point::new(10, 20);
    println!("Point is at ({}, {})", p.x, p.y);
}

=== Visual Basic .NET ===
In Visual Basic .NET, constructors use a method declaration with the name "New".

Class Foobar
    Private strData As String

    ' Constructor
    Public Sub New(ByVal someParam As String)
        strData = someParam
    End Sub
End Class

' code somewhere else
' instantiating an object with the above constructor
Dim foo As New Foobar(".NET")

== See also ==
- new and delete (C++)
- Resource acquisition is initialization (RAII)
- Allocation site
- Creational pattern
- Destructor (computer programming)
- Global constructor in C++, and its C counterpart, ((constructor)) function attribute
