= Undefined variable =

An undefined variable in the source code of a computer program is a variable that is accessed in the code but has not been declared by that code.

In some programming languages, an implicit declaration is provided the first time such a variable is encountered at compile time. In other languages such a usage is considered to be sufficiently serious that a diagnostic being issued and the compilation fails.

Some language definitions initially used the implicit declaration behavior and as they matured provided an option to disable it (e.g. Perl's "use warnings" or Visual Basic's "Option Explicit").

== Examples ==
The following provides some examples of how various programming language implementations respond to undefined variables. Each code snippet is followed by an error message (if any).

=== ECLISP ===
*** - EVAL: variable X has no value

=== C ===
int main() {
  int y = x;
  return 0;
}

foo.c: In function `main':
foo.c:2: error: `x' undeclared (first use in this function)
foo.c:2: error: (Each undeclared identifier is reported only once
foo.c:2: error: for each function it appears in.)

=== JavaScript ===
A ReferenceError only happens if the same piece of executed code has a let or a const (but not var) declaration later on, or if the code is executed in strict mode. In all other cases, the variable will have the special value undefined.

"use strict";
let y = x;

let y = x;
let x; // causes error on line 1

 ReferenceError: x is not defined
 Source File: file:///c:/temp/foo.js

=== Lua ===
y = x

(no error, continuing)

print(y)

nil

=== ML (Standard ML of New Jersey) ===
val y = x;

stdIn:1.9 Error: unbound variable or constructor: x

=== MUMPS ===
Set Y=X

<UNDEF>

=== OCaml ===
let y = x;;

Unbound value x

=== Perl ===
my $y = ($x // 0) + 1; # defined-or operator

(no error)

=== PHP 5 ===
$y = $x;

(no error)

$y="";
$x="";
error_reporting(E_ALL);
$y = $x;

PHP Notice:  Undefined variable: x in foo.php on line 3

=== Python ===
==== Python 3 ====
x = y
Traceback (most recent call last):
  File "<pyshell#0>", line 1, in <module>
    x = y
NameError: name 'y' is not defined

==== Python 2.4 ====
>>> x = y
Traceback (most recent call last):
  File "<stdin>", line 1, in <module>
NameError: name 'y' is not defined

=== REXX ===
signal on novalue
y = x

+++ Error 30 in line 2: Label not found

=== Ruby ===
irb(main):001:0> y = x
NameError: undefined local variable or method `x' for main:Object
	from (irb):1

=== Tcl ===
% set y $x
can't read "x": no such variable

=== VBScript ===
Dim y
y = x

(no error)

Option Explicit

Dim y
y = x

(3, 1) Microsoft VBScript runtime error: Variable is undefined: 'x'
