= Phantom reference =

A phantom reference is a kind of reference in Java, where the memory can be reclaimed. The class is java.lang.ref.PhantomReference. The phantom reference is one of the strengths or levels of 'non strong' reference defined in the Java programming language; the others being weak and soft. Phantom reference are the weakest level of reference in Java; in order from strongest to weakest, they are: strong, soft, weak, phantom.

An object is phantomly referenced after it has been finalized.

In Java 8 and earlier versions, the reference needs to be cleared before the memory for a finalized referent can be reclaimed. A change in Java 9 will allow memory from a finalized referent to be reclaimable immediately.

== Use ==
Phantom references are of limited use, primarily narrow technical uses. First, it can be used instead of a finalize method, guaranteeing that the object is not resurrected during finalization. This allows the object to be garbage collected in a single cycle, rather than needing to wait for a second GC cycle to ensure that it has not been resurrected. A second use is to detect exactly when an object has been removed from memory (by using in combination with a java.lang.ref.ReferenceQueue object), ensuring that its memory is available, for example deferring allocation of a large amount of memory (e.g., a large image) until previous memory is freed.

== Example ==
import java.lang.ref.PhantomReference;
import java.lang.ref.ReferenceQueue;

class Resource {
    private final String name;

    public Resource(String name) {
        this.name = name;
    }

    public String getName() {
        return name;
    }
}

public class PhantomReferenceExample {
    public static void main(String[] args) throws InterruptedException {
        Resource resource = new Resource("My resource");
        ReferenceQueue<Resource> queue = new ReferenceQueue<>();
        PhantomReference<Resource> phantomRef = new PhantomReference<>(resource, queue);

        resource = null;

        System.gc();

        Reference<? extends Resource> ref = queue.poll();
        if (ref != null) {
            System.out.printf("Object is ready to be collected: %s%n", ((PhantomReference<?>)ref).get());
        }
    }
}

== See also ==
- Ephemeron
- Weak reference
- Soft reference
- Circular reference
