= Thin-film bulk acoustic resonator =

Device consisting of piezoelectric material

A thin-film bulk acoustic resonator (FBAR or TFBAR) is a device consisting of a piezoelectric material manufactured by thin film methods between two conductive – typically metallic – electrodes and acoustically isolated from the surrounding medium. The operation is based on the piezoelectricity of the piezolayer between the electrodes.

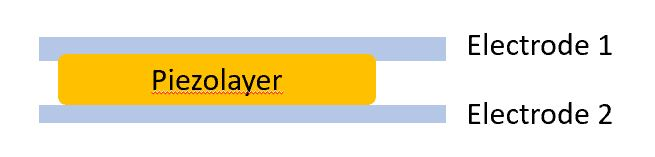
Basic FBAR structure

FBAR devices using piezoelectric films with thicknesses typically ranging from several micrometres down to tenths of micrometres resonate in the frequency range of 100 MHz to 20 GHz. FBAR or TFBAR resonators fall in the category of bulk acoustic resonators (BAW) and piezoelectric resonators and they are used in applications where high frequency, small size like thickness and/or weight is needed.

Industrial application areas of thin film bulk acoustic resonators include high-frequency signal filtering (e.g. for mobile telecommunication devices), crystal replacements, energy harvesting, sensing, sound emission (e.g. in hearing aids) and as part of mechanical qubits.

== Piezoelectricity in thin films ==
The crystallographic orientation of a thin film depends on the piezomaterial selected and many other items like the surface on which the film is grown and various manufacturing - thin film growth - conditions (temperatures selected, pressure, gases used, vacuum conditions etc.).

Any material like lead zirconate titanate (PZT) or barium strontium titanate (BST) from the list of piezoelectric materials could act as an active material in an FBAR. However two compound materials aluminium nitride (AlN) and zinc oxide (ZnO) are the two most studied piezoelectric materials manufactured for high frequency FBAR realisations. This is due to the fact that the properties like stoichiometry of two compound materials can be easier to control compared to three compound materials manufactured by thin film methods. For example, it is known that thin film ZnO with C axis of the crystal structure (crystalline Z axis) normal to the substrate surface excites longitudinal (L) waves. Shear (transverse) (S) waves are excited if C axis of the film crystal structure is 41º tilted. It is also possible – depending on the crystal structure of the film – that both waves (L & S) are excited. Therefore, the understanding and control of the crystal structure of the manufactured piezoelectric film is crucial for the operation of the FBAR.

For high frequency purposes like filtering of signals the energy conversion efficiency is the most important item and therefore longitudinal (L) waves are favored and targeted to be used. For sensing and actuation purposes the structural deformation might be more important than energy conversion efficiency and shear-mode wave excitation will be the target of the manufacturing of the piezoelectric film. Tuneability of resonance frequency of the resonator depends on material choices and may extend application areas.

Despite the lower electromechanical coupling coefficient compared to zinc oxide, aluminum nitride, with a wider band gap has become the most used material in industrial applications, which require a wide bandwidth in signal processing. Compatibility with the silicon integrated circuit technology has supported AlN in FBAR resonator based products like radio frequency filters, duplexers, RF power amplifier or RF receiver modules.

Thin film piezoelectric sensors may be based on various piezoelectric materials depending on the application, but two compound piezoelectric materials are favored due to simplicity of manufacturing.

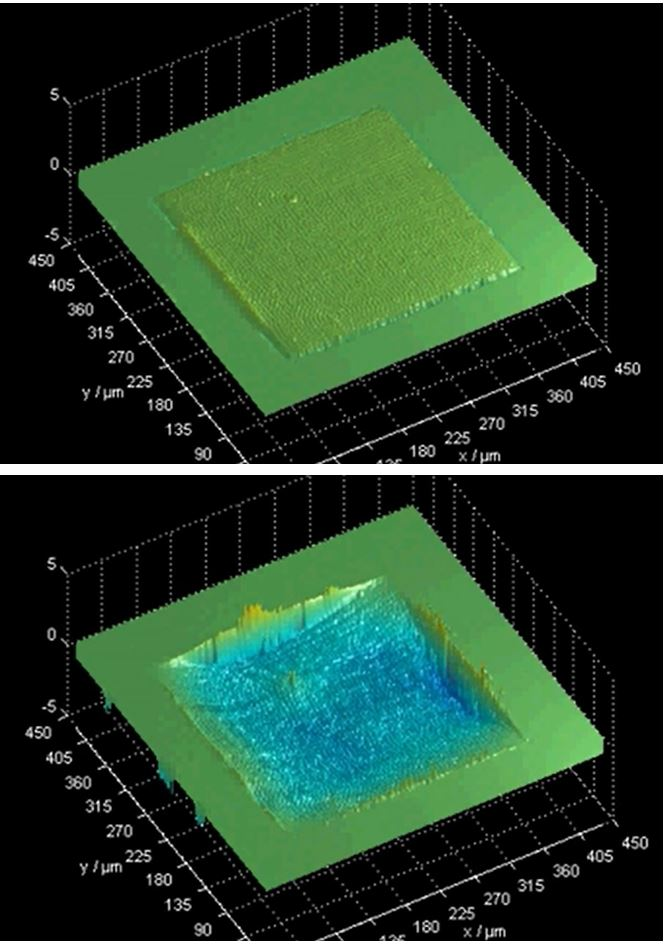
Resonating thin-film bulk acoustic resonator with a square layout

Doping or adding new materials like scandium (Sc), are new directions to improve material properties of AlN for FBARs. Coupling of resonators in lateral direction/transversal excitation may find new ways to integrate resonators and filters with integrated circuits processing technologies specifically for higher frequencies than 3 GHz. Research of new electrode materials or alternative materials to aluminium like by replacing one of the metal electrodes with very light materials like graphene for minimising the loading of the resonator has been demonstrated to lead better control of the resonance frequency.

== Substrates for FBAR resonators and their applications ==
FBAR resonators can be manufactured on ceramic (Al_{2}O_{3} or alumina), sapphire, glass or silicon substrates. However silicon wafer is the most common substrate due to its scalability towards mass manufacturing and compatibility with various manufacturing steps, often typical to semiconductor manufacturing, needed.

During early studies and experimentation phase of thin film resonators in 1967 cadmium sulfide (CdS) was evaporated on a resonant piece of bulk quartz crystal which served as a transducer providing a Q factor (quality factor) of 5000 at the resonance frequency (279 MHz). This was an enabler for tighter frequency control, for needs to use higher frequencies and utilising FBAR resonators. With the development of thin film technologies it was possible to keep the Q factor high enough, leave out the crystal and increase resonance frequency. The experimentation of utilising silicon as a support material and thin film ZnO as an active piezolayer was published in 1981, which can be considered as a first experimentation of a thin film acoustic resonator on silicon.

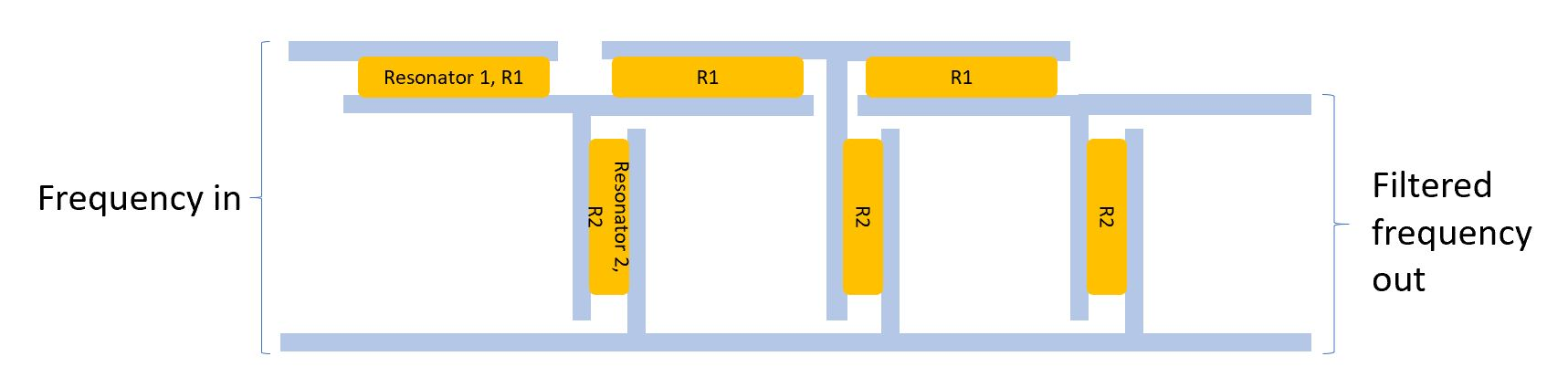
Ladder type bandpass filter based on FBAR resonators. The difference of resonance frequency of resonators 1 and 2 determine the frequency range of frequencies to be passed.

== Application areas ==
FBAR devices can be used for radio frequency filtering. Most smartphones in 2020 include at least one FBAR-based duplexer or filter and some 4/5G products may even include 20–30 functionalities based on FBAR technology mainly due to the increased complexity of radio frequency front end (RFFE, RF front end) electronics – both receiver and transmitter paths – and the antenna/antenna system. Trends to utilize RF spectrum more efficiently with higher frequencies than roughly 1.5–2.5 GHz and in some cases also simultaneously with increasing RF output power have supported FBAR technology to become one of the key enabling technologies in telecommunication realisations. FBAR technology complements and in some cases competes with surface acoustic wave (SAW) technology and FBAR resonators can replace crystals in crystal oscillators and crystal filters at frequencies more than 100 MHz.

Sensing and actuation is a developing area for FBAR resonators and structures based on them like in micro-mirror displays (DMD)s, as well as energy harvesting by utilizing nanogenerators.

FBAR resonators can also be part of magnetoelectric devices like magnetoelectric sensors, antennas and isolators.

== Basic structures ==
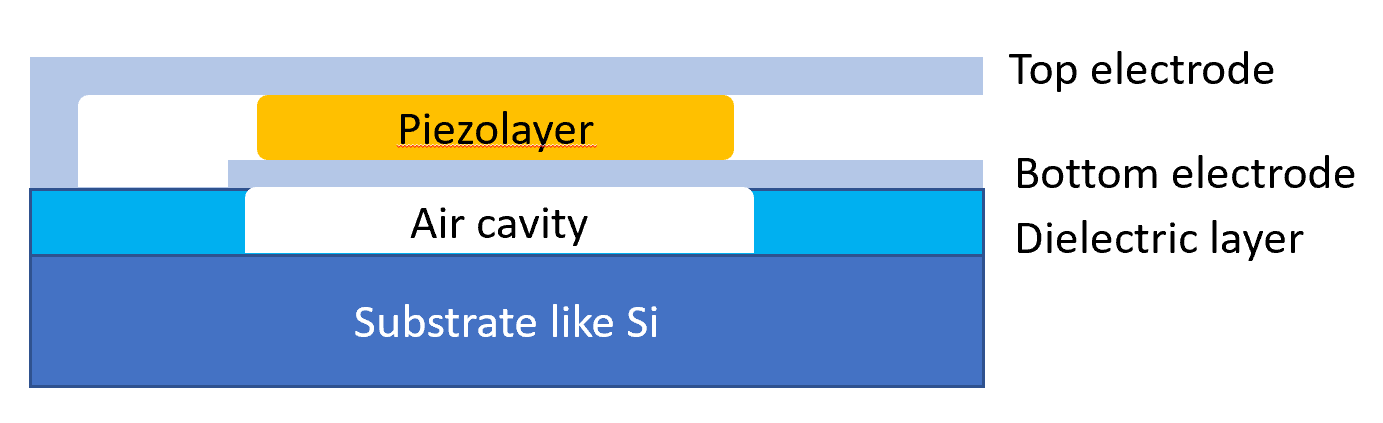
A schematic cross-section of the free-standing FBAR resonator based on surface micromachining etching

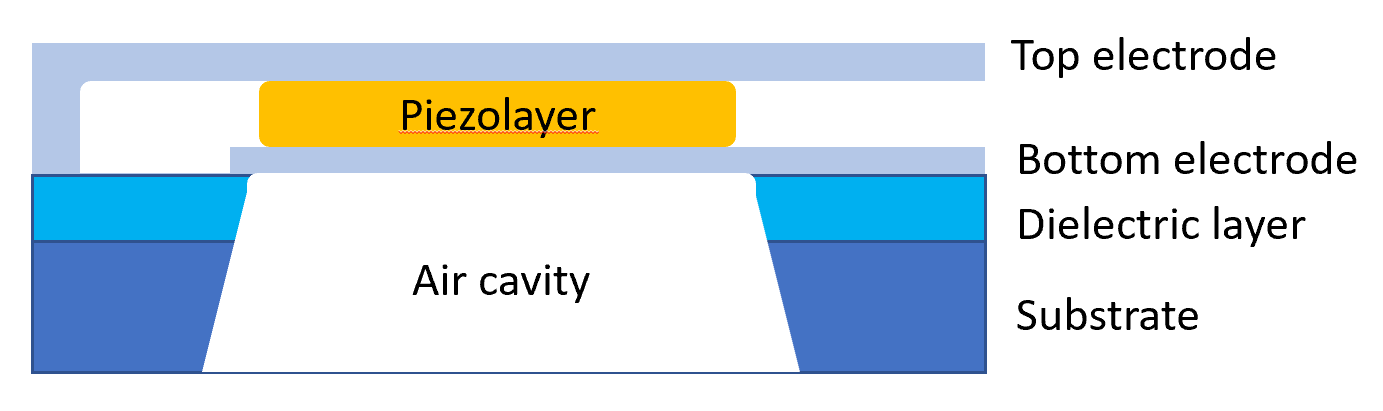
A schematic cross-section of the free-standing FBAR resonator based on bulk micromachining (through the substrate) etching

As of 2022 there are two known structures for thin-film bulk acoustic wave (BAW) resonators: free-standing and solidly mounted (SMR) resonators. In a free-standing resonator structure air is used to separate the resonator from the substrate/surrounding. The structure of a free-standing resonator is based on some typical manufacturing steps used in micro-electromechanical systems MEMS.

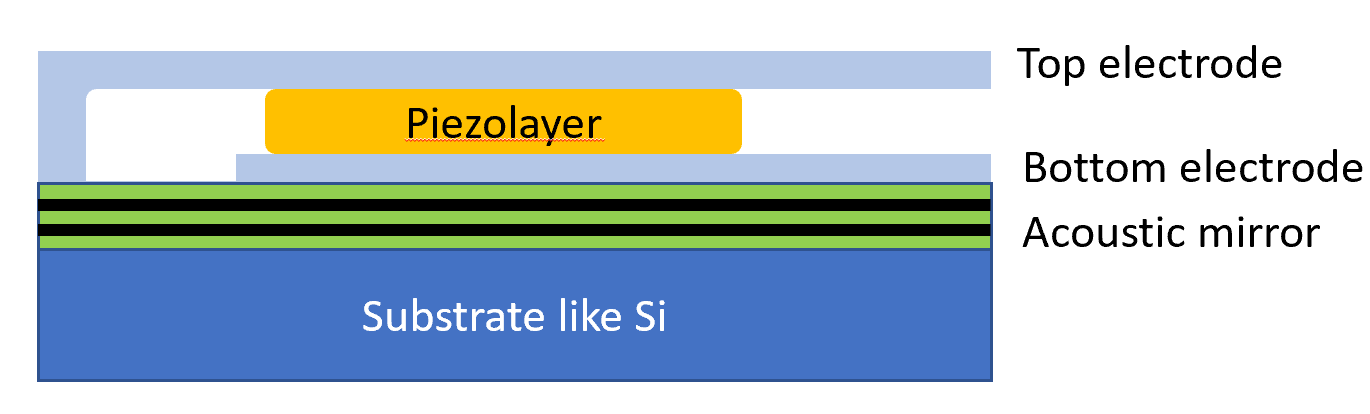
A schematic cross-section of the SMR structure with a one-sided acoustic mirror

In an SMR structure acoustic mirror(s) providing an acoustic isolation is constructed between the resonator and the surrounding like the substrate. The acoustic mirror (such as a Bragg reflector) typically consists of an odd total number of materials with alternating layers of high and low acoustic impedance materials. The thickness of the mirror materials must also be optimized to be the quarter wavelength for maximum acoustic reflectivity. The basic principle of the SMR structure was introduced in 1965.

Schematic pictures of thin film resonators show only the basic principles of the potential structures. In reality some dielectric layers may be needed for other functions, such as for strengthening various parts of the structure. Additionally if needed – for simplifying the final filter layout in the application – resonator structures can be stacked e.g. built on top of each other, as in certain filter applications. However this approach increases the complexity of manufacturing.

Lateral exitation/transversal coupling of resonators is possible in both basic resonator structures SMR and free standing resonator structures in circuitries like filters.

Some performance requirements, such as tuning of the resonance frequency, may also require new materials, additional process steps, such as ion milling, which complicates the manufacturing process, and may have affect to system requirements like adding new functionality to produce tuning voltages.

The newest approach for developing better performing FBARs is to utilize single crystal AlN instead of polycrystalline AlN, and to place electrodes on the same side of the piezolayer.

In order to realize FBAR structures, many precise simulation steps are required during the design phase in order to predict the purity of the resonance frequency and other performance characteristics. At an early phase of the development, basic finite element method (FEM) based modelling techniques that are used for crystals can also be applied and modified for FBARs. Several new methods, such as scanning laser interferometry, are needed to visualise the functionality of the resonators and for helping to improve the design (layout and cross-sectional structure of the resonator) so as to achieve purity of the resonance and the desired resonance modes.

== Application drivers ==
In many applications temperature behavior, stability vs. time, strength and purity of the wanted resonance frequency are forming the base for the performance of the applications based on FBAR resonators. Material choices, layout and design of resonator structures are contributing to the resonator performance and the final performance of the application. Mechanical performance and reliability are determined by the packaging and structure of the resonators in the applications.

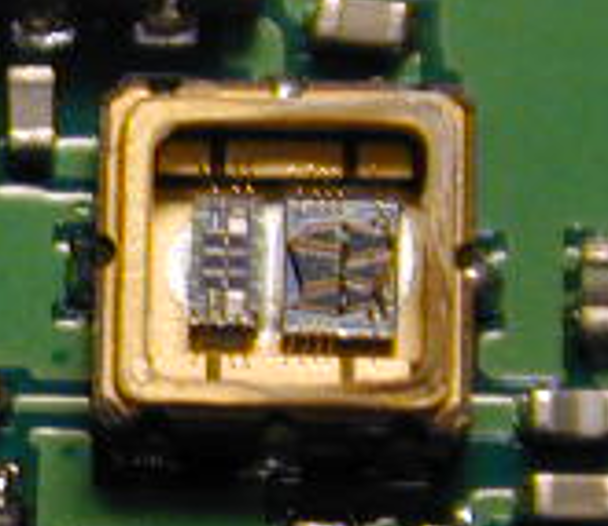
Two FBAR filters on a cellular phone motherboard wirebonded on a LCC carrier. These ladder filters are consisting of six FBAR resonators and the lower band filter on the right hand side uses non-parallel edges for spurious suppression.

A common application of FBARs is radio frequency (RF) filters for use in cell phones and other wireless applications like positioning (GPS, Glonass, BeiDou, Galileo (satellite navigation) etc.), Wi-Fi systems, small telecommunication cells and modules for those. Such filters are made from a network of resonators (either in half-ladder, full-ladder, lattice, a combination of lattice and ladder or stacked topologies) and are designed to remove unwanted frequencies from being transmitted in such devices, while allowing other specific frequencies to be received and transmitted. FBAR filters can also be found in duplexers. FBAR filter technology is complementing surface acoustic wave (SAW) filter technology in areas where increased power handling capability, and electrostatic discharge (ESD) tolerance is needed. Frequencies more than 1.5–2.5 GHz are well-suited for FBAR devices. FBARs on a silicon substrate can be manufactured in high volumes and the manufacturing is supported by all development of semiconductor device fabrication methods. Future requirements of new applications like filtering bandwidth with steep stopband attenuation and lowest possible insertion loss have effects on resonator performance and show development steps needed.

FBARs can also be used in oscillators and synchronizers to replace a crystal/crystals in applications where frequencies more than 100 MHz and/or very low jitter is one of the performance targets.

FBARs can also be used as sensors - gas and liquid. For instance, when a FBAR device is put under mechanical pressure its resonance frequency will shift. Sensing of humidity and volatile organic compounds (VOCs) are demonstrated by using FBARs. A tactile sensor array may also consist of FBAR devices, and gravimetric or mass sensing can be based on FBAR resonators.

As discrete components FBAR technology based parts like basic resonators and filters are packaged in miniaturised/small form factor like wafer level packages. FBARs can also be integrated with power amplifiers (PA) or low noise amplifiers (LNA) to form a module solution with the related electronic circuitry. Although monolithic integrated of FBARs on the same substrate with the electronic circuitry like CMOS has been demonstrated it requires several additional process steps and mask layers on top of IC technology increasing the cost of the solution. Therefore, monolithic solutions have not been progressed as much as module solutions in commercial applications. Typical module solutions are a power amplifier-duplexer module (PAD), or a low-noise amplifier (LNA)-filter module where FBAR(s) and the related circuitry are packaged in the same package possibly on a separate module substrate.

FBARs can be integrated in complex communication like SimpleLink modules for avoiding area/space requirements of an external, packaged crystal. Therefore, FBAR technology has a key role in electronics miniaturisation specifically in applications where oscillators and precise high performance filters are needed.

== Historical and industrial landscape ==
=== Resonators and high frequency filters/duplexers ===
The use of thin film piezoelectric materials in electronics began in the early 1960s at Bell Telephone Laboratories/Bell Labs. Earlier piezoelectric crystals were developed and used as resonators in applications like oscillators with frequencies up to 100 MHz. Thinning was applied for increasing the resonance frequency of the crystals. However, there were limitations of the thinning of crystals and new methods of thin film manufacturing were applied in the early 1970s for increasing accuracy of resonance frequency and targeting increasing manufacturing volumes.

TFR Technologies Inc., founded in 1989, was one of the pioneering companies in the field of FBAR resonators and filters mostly for space and military applications. The first products were delivered to customers in 1997. TFR Technologies Inc. was in 2005 acquired by TriQuint Semiconductor Inc. In early 2015, RF Micro Devices (RFMD), Inc. and TriQuint Semiconductor, Inc. announced a merger to form Qorvo active providing FBAR-based products.

HP Laboratories started a project on FBARs in 1993 concentrating in free-standing resonators and filters. In 1999 FBAR activity became part of Agilent Technologies Inc., which in 2001 delivered 25,000 FBAR duplexers for N-CDMA phones. Later in 2005, FBAR activity at Agilent was one of the technologies of Avago Technologies Ltd., which acquired Broadcom Corporation in 2015. In 2016 Avago Technologies Ltd. changed its name to Broadcom Inc., currently active in providing FBAR-based products.

Infineon Technologies AG started to work with SMR-FBARs in 1999, concentrating in telecommunication filters for mobile applications. The first product was delivered to Nokia Mobile Phones Ltd, which launched the first SMR-FBAR-based GSM three-band mobile phone product in 2001. Infineon's FBAR (BAW) filter group was acquired by Avago Technologies Ltd 2008 which later became part of Broadcom as described before.

After acquiring Panasonic's filtering business in 2016 Skyworks Solutions became one of the major players in BAW/FBAR devices additionally to Broadcom and Qorvo.

Additionally after acquiring rest of RF360 Holdings in 2019 Qualcomm and Kyocera are offering thin film resonator based products like RFFE modules and separate filters.

Many companies like Akoustis Technologies, Inc. (founded in 2014), Newsonic, Saiwei Electronics, Texas Instruments (TI), several universities and research institutes are offering and studying to improve FBAR technology, its performance, manufacturing capacity, advancing design capabilities of FBARs and exploring new application areas jointly with system manufacturers and companies providing simulation tools (Ansys, Comsol Multiphysics, and Resonant Inc. etc.).

Companies in acoustics have also found thin film piezoelectric resonators for miniaturising piezoelectric speakers.

=== Thin film resonator based sensors ===
Because thin film resonators can replace crystals in sensoring, the most potential sensor application area for FBAR resonators is similar to area for the quartz crystal microbalance (QCM). Sensing gaseous and liquid contents can be made with FBAR resonators.

=== Thin film resonator based speakers and microphones ===
By adding several thin film resonators connected in parallel on bulk micro-machined silicon structure the structure can act as a speaker. The realisation of the FBAR based speaker can be very thin. Also small volume and light microphones can be based on FBAR.

== See also ==
- Resonance
- Acoustic resonance
- Acoustic impedance
- RF and microwave filter
- RF front end
- Duplexer
- Piezoelectric sensor
