= Qore =

Qore may refer to:

- Qore (title), a monarch of the Kingdom of Kush
- Qore (PlayStation Network), an interactive online magazine for the PlayStation Network
- Qore (programming language), an embeddable multithreaded programming language
