= Digital Mars =

American software company

- Industry: Software industry
- Founders: Walter Bright
- Headquarters: Vienna, Virginia, United States
- Website: digitalmars.com

Digital Mars is an American computer software company founded by Walter Bright and based in Vienna, Virginia. The company has released compilers for the C, C++, and D programming languages, ECMA 262-compliant scripting engines, associated utilities such as an integrated development environment for Windows and MS-DOS (which Digital Mars calls an "integrated development and debugging environment"), and the video game Empire. Many of Digital Mars's product releases include similar or equivalent software implemented in and for C++, for integration into C++ codebases, and alternatives written likewise in the D programming language.

The compilers are available for free and can be downloaded from the Digital Mars and D community GitHub project pages, with earlier releases still being available from the Digital Mars website.

Product names changed over time. The C compiler was first sold by Datalight as the Datalight C compiler, then Zorland C, then Zortech C, then Digital Mars C/C++ compiler. The C++ compiler was first named Zortech C++, then Symantec C++, then Digital Mars C++ (DMC++).

The company gained notice in the software development community for creating the D programming language. D resulted from Bright's frustration with the direction of the C++ language and from his experience implementing it. Digital Mars is also notable for having shipped the first commercial C++ compiler for Windows.

== History ==
In 1988, Zortech was the first C++ compiler to ship for Windows. PC Magazine ran a graphics benchmark and reported that most executables produced by Zortech ran faster than executables produced by Microsoft C 5.1 and by Watcom C 6.5. Stanley B. Lippman wrote that Zortech was the first C++ compiler to implement return value optimization. Later, the C++ standard required this.

In 2023, Mike Engelhardt released a new simulator QSPICE, which uses this compiler on the backend to allow for C++ and Verilog authored behavioral simulation models to be compiled to native code and loaded by the simulation environment.

== Reception ==
In a February 1989 overview of optimizing C compilers, BYTE approved of Zortech C 1.07's $90 price, included IDE, and Microsoft CodeView compatibility. The magazine reported that the software "lacks some of the features of those in the $400 range" but its code often benchmarked better. BYTE concluded that "Zortech does everything that a compiler has to do—at an attractive price".
