= DLF =

DLF may refer to:

== Organizations ==
=== Government ===
- Deutschlandfunk, a German public broadcasting radio station
- Development Loan Fund, former lending arm of the U.S. International Cooperation Administration

=== Political ===
- Darfur Liberation Front
- Dhofar Liberation Front, a Marxist movement based in southern Oman
- France Arise (Debout la France), a French political party founded by Nicolas Dupont-Aignan
- Liberal People's Party (Norway, 1972), a defunct political party (1972–1988)
- Liberal People's Party (Norway), a political party created in 1992

=== Non-profit and charity ===
- David Lynch Foundation, a charitable foundation based in Fairfield, Iowa, which operates throughout the world
- Digital Library Federation, an international consortium of libraries and related agencies that are pioneering the use of electronic-information technologies to extend collections and services
- Disabled Living Foundation, a non-profit organisation based in the United Kingdom that provides advice on disability issues for older and disabled people
- D Language Foundation, nonprofit organization devoted to the D programming language

=== Other ===
- DLF (seed company) DLF is a global seed company headquartered in Roskilde, Denmark.
- DLF (company), India's largest real estate firm, formerly known as Delhi Land and Finance

== Sports ==
- Dead Last Finish(er)
- Derby Lunatic Fringe a football hooligan firm based in Derby, England

== Other uses ==
- Deed in lieu of foreclosure, a deed instrument in which a mortgagor conveys all interest in a real property to the mortgagee to satisfy a loan that is in default and avoid foreclosure proceedings
- Desolation Lava Field, a lava field in British Columbia, Canada
- Destination Lookup Failure
