= RF Micro Devices =

American semiconductor company

RF Micro Devices, Inc.
- Type: Public company
- Traded as: Nasdaq: RFMD
- Industry: Semiconductor components
- Founded: 1991; 35 years ago
- Defunct: January 2, 2015
- Fate: Merged with TriQuint Semiconductor
- Successor: Qorvo
- Headquarters: Greensboro, North Carolina, U.S.
- Area served: Worldwide
- Key people: Robert A. Bruggeworth (President and Chief Executive Officer)
- Brands: PowerStar, PowerSmart, Polaris Total Radio
- Revenue: ▲US$944 million (2013); US$872 million (2012)
- Operating income: ▼US$-15.7 million (2013); US$24.6 million (2012)
- Net income: ▼US$-53.0 million (2013); US$0.9 million (2012)
- Total assets: ▼US$932 million (2013); US$965 million (2012)
- Total equity: ▲US$639 million (2013); US$672 million (2012)
- Number of employees: 3,500 (2014)
- Website: rfmd.com

RF Micro Devices (also known as RFMD or RF Micro), was an American company that designed and manufactured high-performance radio frequency systems for applications that drive wireless and broadband communications. Headquartered in Greensboro, North Carolina, RFMD traded on the NASDAQ under the symbol RFMD. The Company was founded in Greensboro, North Carolina, in 1991. RF Micro had 3500 employees, 1500 of them in Guilford County, North Carolina.

The company's products, predominantly radio frequency integrated circuits (RFICs) and packaged modules that utilize them, were used in cellular networks and mobile phones, for wireless connectivity such as wireless LAN, GPS and Bluetooth, in cable modems and cable TV infrastructure, and for other applications including military radar. The most important applications in terms of sales were GaAs-based power amplifiers and antenna control solutions used in mobile phones (including smartphones), WiFi RF front-ends and components used in wireless infrastructure equipment.

The company announced in February 2014 that it would merge with TriQuint Semiconductor. On January 2, 2015, RFMD and Triquint jointly announced that they had completed their merger of equals to form Qorvo (Nasdaq: QRVO), and that Qorvo would start trading on the NASDAQ Global Stock Market starting from that day.

== Corporate history ==
=== Early history ===
First logo, used from 1991 until the mid-2000s

The company was founded in 1991 in Greensboro, North Carolina by William J. Pratt, Powell T. Seymour and Jerry D. Neal, all of whom were former employees of Analog Devices. From the beginning, it was focused on designing RFIC products for the commercial wireless market.

In 1992 RFMD licensed GaAs HBT (gallium arsenide heterojunction bipolar transistor) technology from space and defense contractor TRW Inc. From 1993 until RFMD built its own semiconductor fabrication plant in 1998, it used TRW as a contract manufacturer while TRW acquired a 10% ownership interest in the company. GaAs HBT emerged as a leading technology for high-performance RF applications, such as power amplifiers and small signal devices used in cellular handsets.

RFMD initially supplied ICs for Qualcomm's digital cell phones, and by 1998 had gained Samsung, Nokia, and LG as customers, as production continued to increase. At the end of fiscal year 1997, the company had 133 employees and revenues of $29 million.

=== IPO and prominence ===
The IPO of the company on the NASDAQ stock market occurred on June 3, 1997 under the symbol RFMD. At the time of the IPO, the company was a pioneer and leader in the use GaAs HBT process technology for commercial wireless applications, which had benefits in power efficiency, linearity, complexity and size, while also having expertise in older GaAs MESFET and silicon polar transistor process technology.

To strengthen its position in silicon-based products, RFMD entered into an agreement with IBM to use its Blue Logic silicon process technology, and in 1999 gained access to IBM's silicon germanium foundry services.

After construction of the company's own fabrication facilities was completed in 1998, its revenues for fiscal year 1999 ending March 27 more than tripled to $153 million, with net income of $20 million. RFMD's stock price increased to a high of about $95 in March 1999, and the stock split several times. Following a supply agreement with Nokia, at the time the world's largest cell phone maker, sales to Nokia consisted of 59% of the company's revenue in fiscal year 2000. Nokia continued to be RFMD's largest customer for several years until 2011.

On March 3, 2000, the closing price of RFMD's stock reached its highest level of $175 ($87.5 adjusted for subsequent stock splits), representing a market capitalization of approximately US$15 billion, based on 86 million shares outstanding. RFMD was a member of the NASDAQ-100 index from 1999 to 2003. After reaching its peak during the tech bubble, the stock price declined substantially and remained below $10 until 2014.

=== Development of Polaris transceiver technology ===
In 2002, RFMD announced Polaris (Polaris Total Radio transceiver), a three IC solution aimed at GSM/GPRS/EDGE mobile phone architectures. By adding transceiver technology, the company sought to increase its content in GSM/GPRS/EDGE handsets.

Polaris chipsets were designed into handsets from Motorola and significantly contributed to revenue growth by 2005. RFMD started high-volume shipments of Polaris 3 (a fully integrated quad-band EDGE RF front-end) to Nokia in the 2007. However, as Motorola handset sales weakened in 2007, and a strategic shift towards a single-chip baseband/transceivers and away from RFMD's Polaris transceivers was evident at customers such as Motorola, RFMD's Polaris business began to see challenges.

In May 2008, after significantly reduced expectations for transceiver revenue at RFMD's largest POLARIS 2 customer, RFMD announced that it would eliminate all product development expenses related to wireless systems, including cellular transceivers and GPS, although it would continue to support current products. In June 2008, it announced that its Polaris solutions, including the most recent Polaris 3 which was still ramping up, continued to be designed into new handsets, and said that its Polaris 2 had shipped 100 million units. It expected sales of its Polaris RF solutions to continue until calendar year 2011.

=== Other developments ===
In 2001, RFMD started operation of an assembly and test facility in Beijing, China. The facility was expanded several times. In 2008 RFMD transferred all testing of high-volume cellular products to the facility.

RFMD has been a pioneer in developing GaN (gallium nitride)-based products for military and commercial applications. Since 2004, the company has been awarded GaN R&D contracts from the U.S. government. In 2013, it introduced products targeting Cable TV infrastructure. In 2014, it announced contracts relating to military and power grid applications. RFMD operates an open foundry offering GaN semiconductor technology (as well established GaAs technology) to third parties.

=== Acquisitions and mergers ===
In early 2001, RFMD bought RF Nitro Communications (RF Nitro) that was founded in Charlotte, NC by Dr. James Shealy in 2000 using technology licensed from Cornell to produce on 100mm(4inch) wafers, advanced wide-band gap semiconductor materials and RFIC products (InGaP HBT, GaAs PHEMT, and GaN HEMT on both silicon carbide and sapphire substrates) typically implemented in laser diodes that were further incorporated into broadband wireless and fibre-optic end products. One notable advantage at the time to the Cornell licensed technology was the ability to obtain high semiconductor growth rates at low temperatures.

In late 2007, RFMD bought another RF component maker, Sirenza Microdevices, which was expected to allow RFMD to capitalize on its RF integration and systems-level design expertise from cellular applications and apply those capabilities across Sirenza's broad footprint in multiple high-growth RF markets, including broadband/CATV, wireless infrastructure, WiMAX and aerospace and defense. In December 2007 it announced the acquisition of Filtronic Compound Semiconductor Ltd, which had been a major UK-based supplier of GaAs pHEMT semiconductors to RFMD, and subsequently sold the UK facility to Compound Photonics in 2013. In November 2012, RFMD acquired Los Gatos, California-based Amalfi Semiconductor to enter the CMOS power amplifier (PA) market.

In February 2014, RFMD announced it would merge with TriQuint Semiconductor. On April 15, 2014, the two companies announced that the holding company for both RF Micro and TriQuint would be called Rocky Holding Inc., with both companies considered subsidiaries. Each company's shareholders would own a 50 percent stake. Rocky Holding will trade on the NASDAQ, and RF Micro's Robert Bruggeworth will be president and CEO, while TriQuint's Ralph Quinsey will be chairman. The deal was projected to close in the second half of the year, after which the companies will execute a one-for-four reverse stock split resulting in 145 million shares outstanding.

On January 2, 2015, RFMD and Triquint jointly announced that they had completed their merger of equals to form Qorvo (NASDAQ: QRVO), and that Qorvo would start trading on the NASDAQ Global Stock Market starting from that day.

== Markets and competitors ==
=== GaAs-based RFICs ===
While the foundry model has come to prominence for the manufacture of CMOS logic integrated circuits, the manufacture of GaAs ICs has remained largely in the hands of vertically integrated companies like RFMD who both design the IC and manufacture it at their own fabrication facilities using proprietary process technology. This puts such companies at risk of underutilization of their manufacturing capacity when demand falls, which has frequently affected RFMD and impacted its profitability. Indeed, in recent times RFMD has started offering foundry services to manufacture GaAs-based products designed by third parties. The largest independent GaAs foundry competitor, Taiwan-based WIN Semiconductor, has seen mixed results.

Vertically integrated competitors in the market for GaAs-based RFICs for Wireless applications such as mobile phones, wireless infrastructure and wireless LAN include Skyworks Solutions, Avago, ANADIGICS, Murata and TriQuint Semiconductor, with which RFMD has signed a merger agreement.

Despite the fact that the wireless GaAs device market has continued to grow in recent years, RFMD has seen mixed results. Competitors Skyworks and Avago have seen their GaAs revenues increase consistently, while RFMD experienced lower sales in 2011 and 2012 and lost market share. RFMD's GaAs device market share declined from 20% in 2008 (when it was #1) to 12.4% in 2011 and further declined in 2012 before a recovery in 2013/2014. For Q2 2014, RFMD reported strong sequential growth, reaching record quarterly revenue of US$316 million and improved profitability, while forecasting further growth for Q3 2014.

RFMD's Polaris chipsets, sold from 2004 to 2011, were aligned with certain established but declining baseband architectures, including Freescale and essentially competed with RF transceiver solutions from growing mobile phone baseband/application processor companies Qualcomm and MediaTek, which were quickly becoming dominant and used their own RF transceiver solutions as part of their reference designs alongside the baseband/application processor, with the front-end/PA component sockets remaining open to GaAs chip manufacturers. The subsequent success of companies such as Skyworks, TriQuint and Avago in capturing the front-end/PA sockets on these industry-leading reference designs has been noted.

=== Shift to CMOS-based RFICs ===
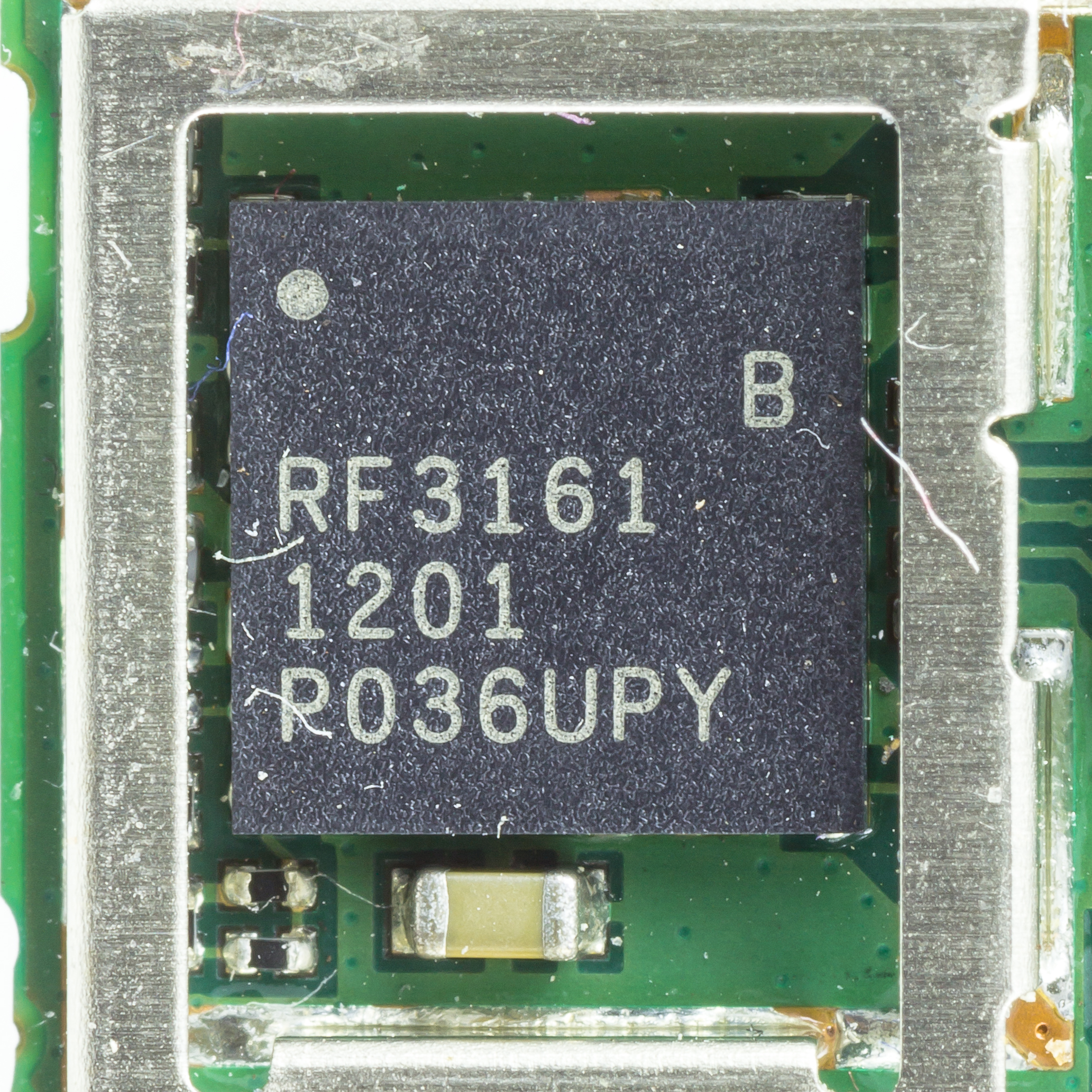
RF3161 (Quad band power amplifier module)

As CMOS silicon-based RFICs for wireless applications such as mobile phones have gradually become more competitive (but still inferior) in terms of performance when compared to GaAs (while providing advantages relating to cost and chip integration), they have replaced GaAs products for part of the low-end (2G) power amplifier market as of early 2014. Silicon on insulator technology has already largely replaced GaAs for antenna switch applications, and RFMD has been part of this transition. At various times in the past companies have had strong expectations for CMOS-based RFICs such as power amplifiers which failed to materialize. However, Qualcomm, the dominant provider of the silicon chip content in mobile phones, has made significant investments in this area and reported volume shipments of a 3G/4G front-end solution using CMOS-based power amplifier technology in February 2014.

Proliferation of CMOS-based solutions increases competition from CMOS RF companies such as Peregrine Semiconductor as well as mobile phone SoC and chipset providers such as Qualcomm and others, and has the potential to significantly reduce the addressable market for GaAs-based devices. However, companies traditionally focused on GaAs, including RFMD, already use silicon-on-insulator (SOI) technology for switches, and have also invested in CMOS technology for power amplifiers. RFMD announced material volume shipment of CMOS PAs in September 2013.
