= FBAR =

FBAR may refer to:

- Thin-film bulk acoustic resonator
- Foreign Bank and Account Report under the US Bank Secrecy Act
