= Natalino Camilleri =

Electronics engineer

Natalino Camilleri from the Nitero, Inc., Austin, TX was named Fellow of the Institute of Electrical and Electronics Engineers (IEEE) in 2015 for leadership in radio frequency integrated circuits and systems.

== Early life ==
Camilleri received the B.S.E.E. degree from the University of Malta and the M.S.E.E. and Ph.D. degrees from the University of Texas at Austin.

== Career ==
He possesses over 20 years of experience in the development and creation of RF systems and integrated circuits. He is currently the President of RF & Wireless Design Services Inc., Cupertino, CA, a consulting company performing RFIC design.

Earlier in his career, he started up the Radio Product Line at Advanced Micro Devices, and was able to take some early product ideas and develop the award-winning chip set for digital spread-spectrum (DSS) cordless phones. He led the group through an acquisition by DSPG and was the President of RF Integrated Systems Inc.

He was instrumental in the development of the 900-MHz giga-range phones by Panasonic that use DSS chip sets. At AMD, he also developed integrated circuits (ICs) for wireless local-area network (WLAN) and GSM applications. Prior to his involvement with AMD, he was the Silicon RF Technology Manager at Motorola, where he developed leading-edge circuits for new technologies such as SiGe, BiCMOS, LDMOS, and CMOS.

He was instrumental in developing the LDMOS discrete technology and was the founding father for the LDMOS IC technology for Motorola. These products are now the premiere technology for Motorola’s RF business. He originally joined Motorola to start up the GaAs operation as the Design and Application Manager. He was instrumental in kicking off the early technology and IC products that later fueled GaAs RFIC business for Motorola.

Prior to Motorola, he was with HP-Avantek and Texas Instruments, where he was a Senior Member of the Technical Staff and developed ICs for microwave and millimeter-wave applications. He has authored or co-authored over 50 papers concerning RF technology. Camilleri has been on several IEEE Microwave Theory and Techniques Society (IEEE MTT-S) Technical Program Committees (TPCs) for 15 years and has held several positions on the RFIC Symposium Steering Committee.
