= D Language Foundation =

U.S. nonprofit organization

- Abbreviation: DLF
- Formation: October 16, 2015
- Type: 501(c)(3) nonprofit organization
- Purpose: Promote, protect, and advance open source technology related to the D (programming language)
- Headquarters: Kenmore, Washington, United States
- Region served: Worldwide
- Official language: English
- President: Walter Bright
- Chairman: Andrei Alexandrescu
- Website: dlang.org/foundation.html

The D Language Foundation (DLF) is a nonprofit organization devoted to the D programming language launched on October 16, 2015.

The mission of the foundation is to foster development of the D community and is responsible for various processes within the D community, including developing the D programming language, managing intellectual rights, and raising funds. The foundation awards scholarships to students allowing them to work on high-impact projects related to the D programming language. The D Language Foundation also organizes developer conferences including the yearly D Programming Language Conference (DConf) and is an official organization in the Google Summer of Code.

In 2015, Andrei Alexandrescu seeded the D Language Foundation's budget from his royalties. and started to work for the D Language Foundation.
