= Qorvo =

American semiconductor company acquired by Skyworks Solutions in 2026

Qorvo, Inc.
- Type: Subsidiary
- Industry: Semiconductors
- Predecessor: RF Micro DevicesTriQuint Semiconductor
- Founded: 2015; 11 years ago
- Fate: Acquired by Skyworks Solutions
- Successor: Skyworks Solutions
- Headquarters: Greensboro
- Key people: Bob Bruggeworth
- Products: Radio-frequency components, power management, analog and mixed-signal semiconductors
- Parent: Skyworks Solutions
- Website: www.qorvo.com

Qorvo, Inc. was an American semiconductor company headquartered in Greensboro, North Carolina. It developed and manufactured radio-frequency (RF), analog, mixed-signal and power-management semiconductor products for wireless communications, automotive, defense and aerospace, industrial, infrastructure and other applications.

In October 2026, Qorvo completed a combination with Skyworks Solutions. Following completion of the transaction, Qorvo ceased to be an independently traded public company and became part of Skyworks. The combined company operates under the Skyworks name.

== History ==
Its corporate history traces to two semiconductor companies, RF Micro Devices and TriQuint Semiconductor.

Founded in 1991, the first developed RF components and semiconductor solutions for wireless communications and other applications. In turn, TriQuint was founded in 1985 and developed semiconductor technologies used in communications, defense, aerospace and other markets.

In 2014, RF Micro Devices and TriQuint Semiconductor announced plans to combine; the transaction was completed in 2015, creating Qorvo, Inc. Following its formation, it developed RF and semiconductor technologies for mobile devices, cellular infrastructure, wireless connectivity, defense and aerospace, automotive, industrial and infrastructure applications.

The firm expanded its portfolio through internal development and acquisitions, including technologies in RF front-end components, power management and other semiconductor applications. It was headquartered in Greensboro, North Carolina, and operated research, engineering, manufacturing and sales facilities in the United States and internationally.

=== Qorvo as an independent company ===
Qorvo was created on January 1, 2015, with the merger of TriQuint Semiconductor and RF Micro Devices (RFMD). In June 2015, the new company became a component of the S&P 500. At the time of joining the S&P 500, Qorvo was valued at $12 billion. The company employs more than 8,000 people. As of mid-2016, the Oregon plant alone was employing almost 1,000 people.

In 2016, GreenPeak Technologies was acquired, adding ultra-low power, short-range wireless connected home and IoT to its portfolio. GreenPeak Technologies was best known for its Zigbee chips, of which it had sold 100 million in 2015. GreenPeak Technologies was headquartered in Utrecht, The Netherlands.

In 2019, Qorvo acquired Active-Semi International, a company with experience in power efficiency and power management, which have become skills useful for designing circuitry for 5G equipment, the Internet of things (IoT).

In 2020, Qorvo acquired the Irish fabless semiconductor company Decawave in a deal that was estimated to be worth $400 million.

In 2021, Qorvo announced the acquisition of Mountain View, California–based NextInput, a pioneer in the emerging field of force-sensing for human-machine interface (HMI). On November 3, 2021, Qorvo announced the acquisition of Princeton, New Jersey–based United Silicon Carbide (UnitedSiC), a leading manufacturer of silicon carbide–based semiconductors, such SiC FETs, SiC JFETs, SiC Diodes.

In 2023, Qorvo announced QSPICE circuit simulation software would be limited beta testing in May, then open beta testing in July. It is developed by Mike Engelhardt, the author of LTspice.

QSPICE has won multiple industry awards. It was honored as the Design Tool and Development Software Product of the Year at the 2023 Elektra Awards. In 2024, QSPICE received the Électrons d'Or Trophy from Electroniques magazine in the CAD / Measurement / Tools category for significant strides in circuit simulation, plus overcoming challenges in accuracy, efficiency and scalability.

In 2024, Qorvo announced the acquisition of Anokiwave, a company that specializes in high-performance RFIC design.

=== Combination with Skyworks ===
On October 28, 2025, Qorvo and Skyworks Solutions announced an agreement to combine the two companies in a cash-and-stock transaction. The transaction was valued at approximately $22 billion based on the companies’ market values at the time of announcement.

Under the terms of the transaction, each Qorvo shareholder was entitled to receive ‘’’$32.50 in cash and 0.960 shares of Skyworks common stock’’’ for each Qorvo share held. On a fully diluted basis, former Skyworks shareholders were expected to own approximately 63% of the combined company, while former Qorvo shareholders were expected to own approximately 37%.

In October 2026, after receiving the required regulatory clearance and completing the combination of its operations, the firm continued to operate as Skyworks Solutions, Inc. and remained listed on the NASDAQ under the ticker symbol SWKS; Qorvo’s former NASDAQ ticker ceased to represent an independently traded company.

=== Post-combination business ===
The combination brought together the companies’ RF, analog, mixed-signal and power-management semiconductor portfolios. Skyworks stated that the combined company would have approximately 8,000 engineers and more than 12,000 issued and pending patents.

The combined business serves markets including mobile communications, automotive, defense and aerospace, data centers and networking, industrial applications and connected-edge technologies. The transaction also expanded Skyworks’ exposure to RF gallium-nitride technology, low-voltage power products and wired broadband applications.

Skyworks stated that it expected the combination to produce at least $500 million in annual cost synergies within 24 to 36 months after completion and that the transaction was immediately accretive to non-GAAP earnings per share.

== Products and technology ==
Before its combination with Skyworks, Qorvo developed semiconductor products including:

- RF front-end components
- RF amplifiers and filters
- Power amplifiers
- RF switches
- Connectivity solutions
- Power-management products
- Analog and mixed-signal semiconductor products
- Gallium-nitride RF technologies
- Semiconductor solutions for defense and aerospace
- Automotive semiconductor solutions
- Industrial and infrastructure products

Following the combination, these technologies form part of Skyworks’ broader semiconductor portfolio.

== Corporate affairs ==
=== Leadership ===
Bob Bruggeworth served as Qorvo’s president and chief executive officer prior to completion of the combination. Following the transaction, Bruggeworth joined the Skyworks board of directors.

Skyworks president and chief executive officer Phil Brace continued as chief executive officer and president of the combined company.

== Products ==
Qorvo products include electronic amplifiers for usage in radar systems, PMICs for device charging in vehicles and transistors that are needed in IFF and avionic devices. The company also sells RF chips and front end components for use in smartphones. Furthermore Qorvo offers SiC power semiconductors, as well as low power wireless components.

== See also ==
- Skyworks Solutions
- RF Micro Devices
- TriQuint Semiconductor
- Radio-frequency engineering
- Semiconductor industry
