= Walter Bright =

American computer programmer (born 1959)

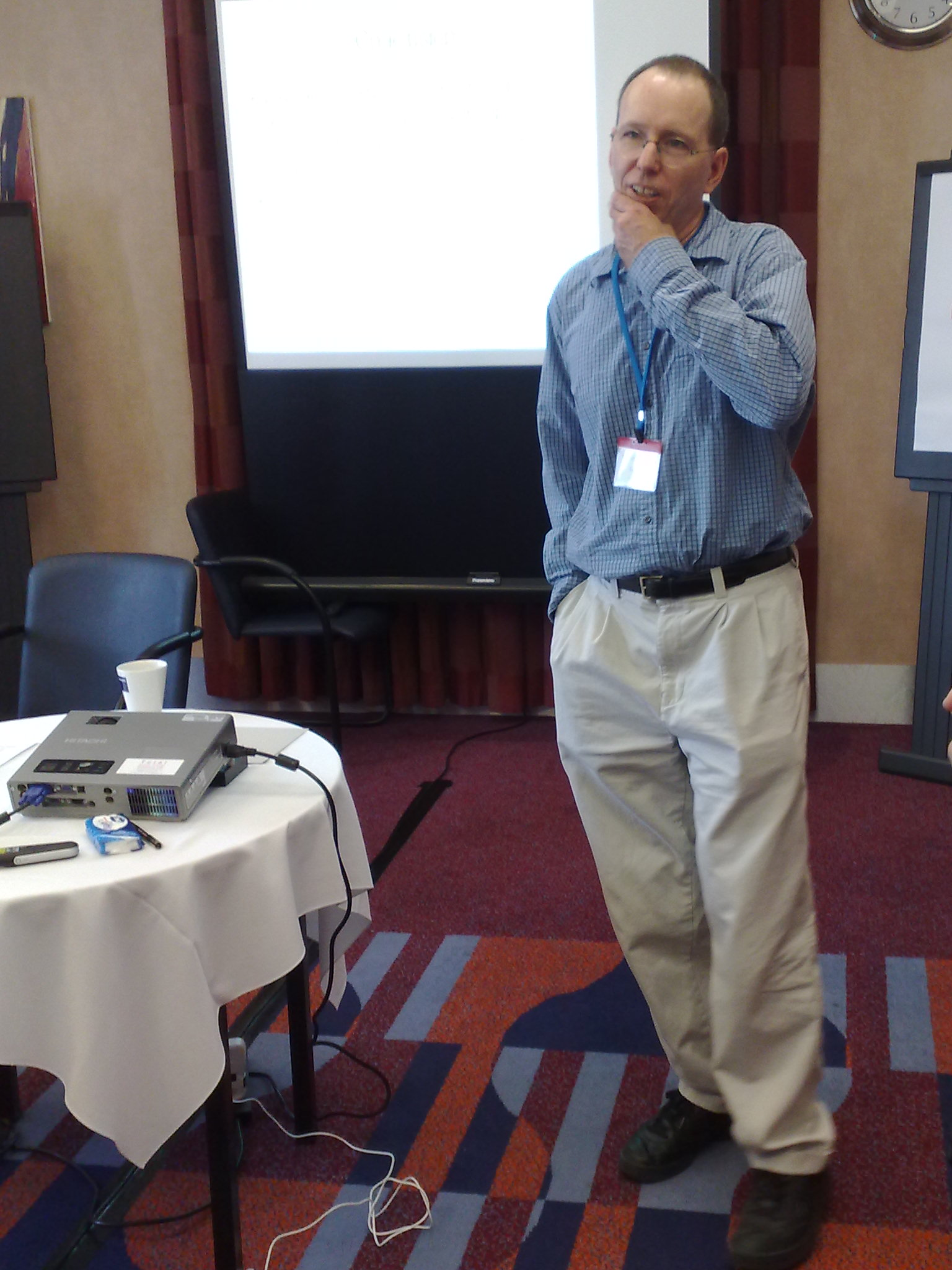
- Bright at ACCU 2009
- Born: March 10, 1959 (age 67)
- Education: Caltech (BS, 1979)
- Known for: D (programming language); Empire
- Spouse: Trish Bright
- Website: walterbright.com

Walter G. Bright (born March 10, 1959) is an American computer programmer who created the D programming language, the Zortech C++ compiler, and the Empire computer game.

== Early life and education ==
Bright is the son of the United States Air Force pilot Charles D. Bright. He taught himself computer programming from the type-in programs in BASIC Computer Games.

Bright graduated from Caltech in 1979 with a Bachelor of Science in Mechanical Engineering and a minor in Aeronautical Engineering. While at university he wrote the Empire wargame for the PDP-10 mainframe.

== Career ==
Bright wrote Mattel Intellivision games while at Caltech, then worked as a mechanical engineer after graduation. After learning C in the early 1980s he ported Empire to the IBM PC, stating that C "might as well have been called EIL, for 'Empire Implementation Language.'" Bright developed the Datalight C compiler, also sold as Zorland C and later Zortech C.

Bright was the main developer of the Zortech C++ compiler (later Symantec C++, now Digital Mars C++), which was the first C++ compiler to translate source code directly to object code without using C as an intermediate.

=== D programming language ===
Bright is the creator of the D programming language. He has implemented compilers for several other languages, and is considered an expert in many areas related to compiler technology. Walter regularly writes scientific and magazine articles about compilers and programming and was a blogger for Dr. Dobb's Journal.

Around 2014, Bright wrote Warp, a fast C/C++ preprocessor written in D, for Facebook.
