= Qore (title) =

Title of Kushite rulers

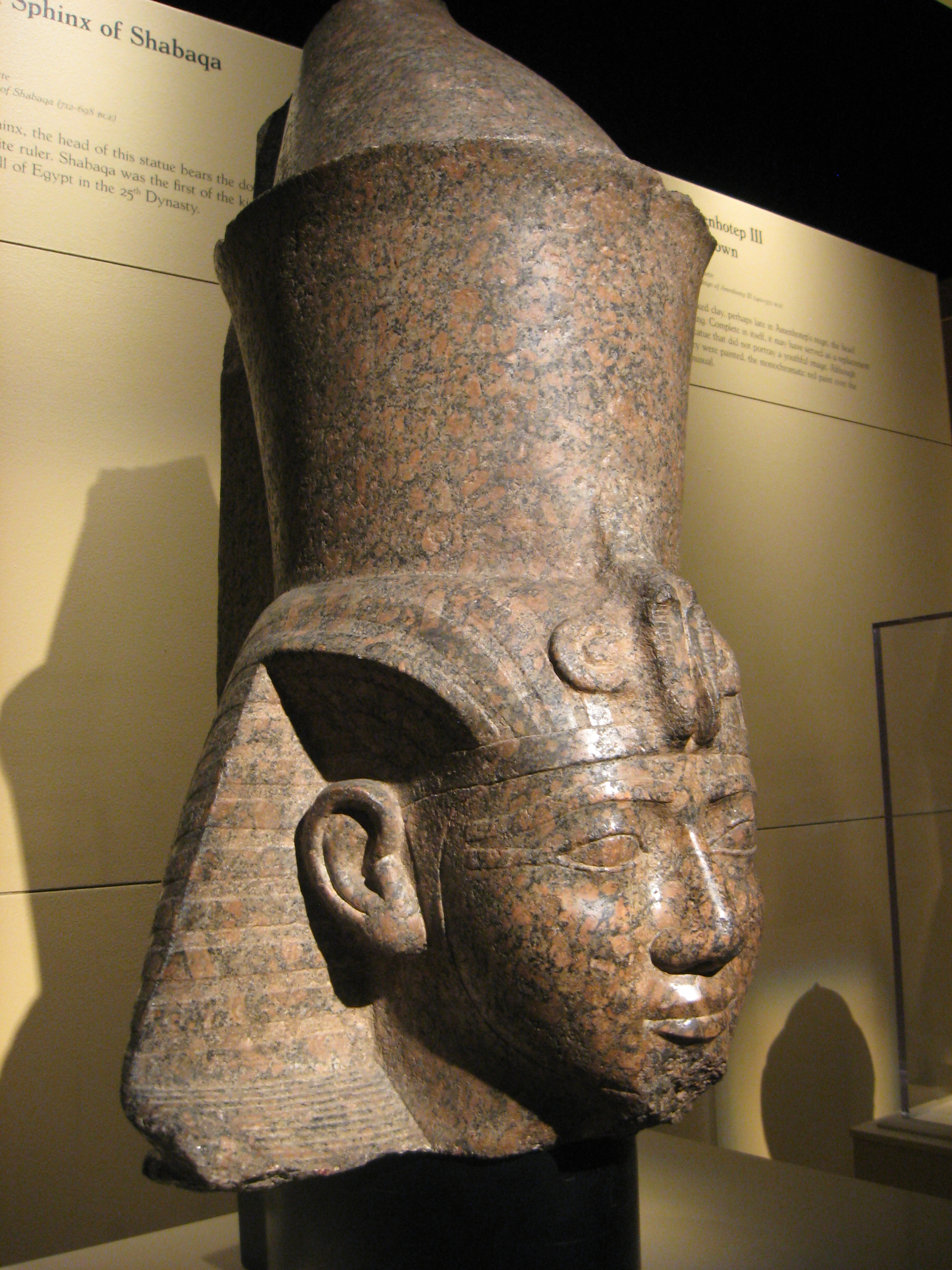
Shabaka Sphinx Head. King of Kush. 25th dynasty of Egypt

Qore was the title of rulers in the Kingdom of Kush, specifically during the Meroitic Period, in the land of Nubia (present-day Sudan).

== See also ==
- Kandake
- Ngola
- Pharaoh
