= TriQuint Semiconductor =

American semiconductor company

Coordinates: 45°32′25″N 122°56′09″W

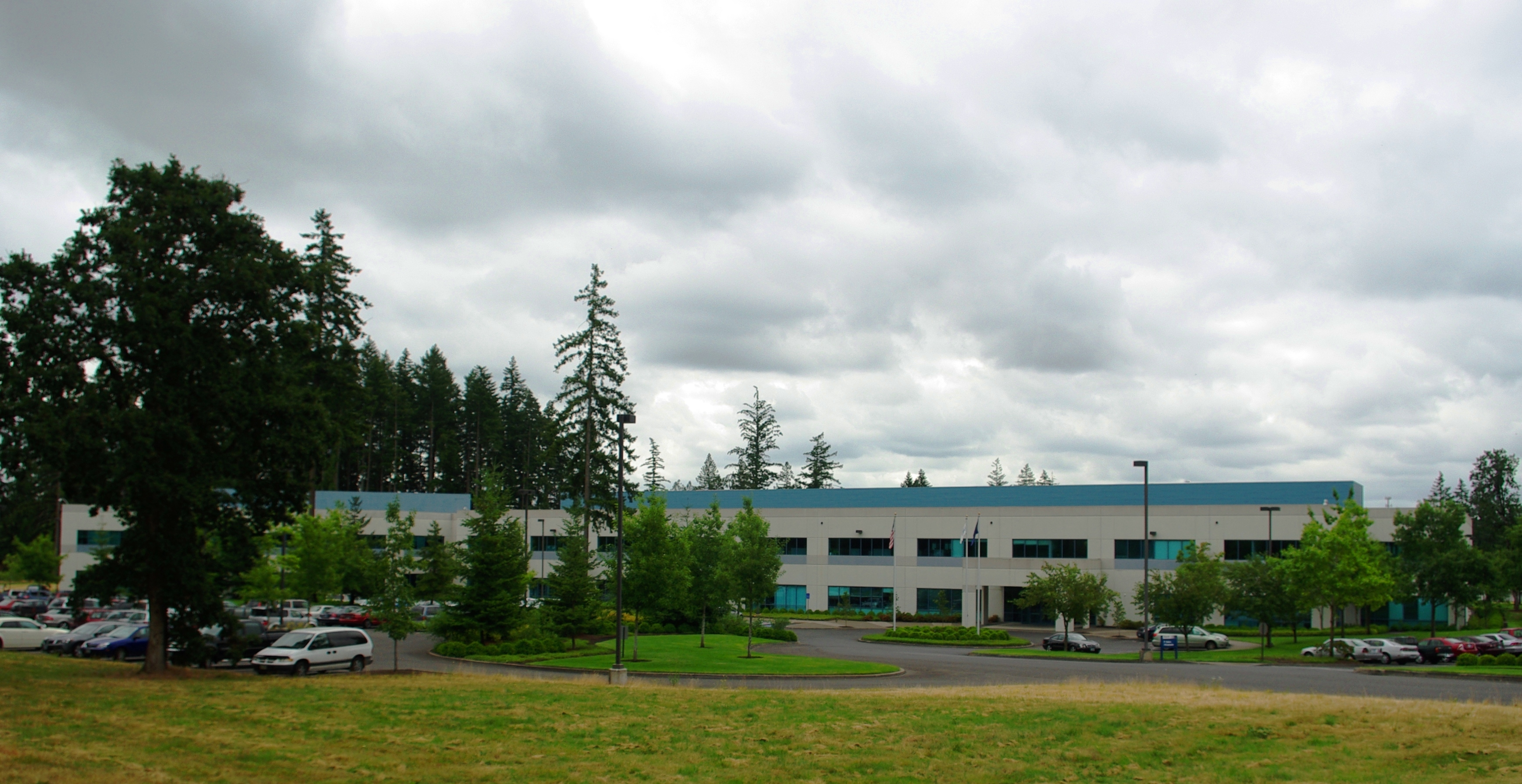
- Former company headquarters in Hillsboro, Oregon
- Type: Subsidiary
- Traded as: Nasdaq: TQNT
- Industry: Wireless handsets, Base Station, Broadband Communications, Military, Foundry
- Founded: 1985; 41 years ago, Beaverton, Oregon, U.S.
- Headquarters: Hillsboro, Oregon, U.S.
- Products: SAW and BAW filters, GaAs and GaN foundry services and components

TriQuint Semiconductor was a semiconductor company that designed, manufactured, and supplied high-performance RF modules, components and foundry services. The company was founded in 1985 in Beaverton, Oregon, before moving to neighboring Hillsboro, Oregon. In February 2014, Greensboro, North Carolina–based RF Micro Devices and TriQuint announced a merger in which the new company would be Qorvo, Inc., with the merger completed on January 1, 2015.

== History ==
TriQuint Semiconductor began in the mid-1980s as a subsidiary of Tektronix. In 1985 the founders held a contest to come up with a name for the company. The winning entry paid homage to the gallium arsenide on which the company was founded. *Tri, from the Greek for “a prefix meaning three, thrice, threefold”, and quint, from the Latin for “a set or sequence of five” literally means 3-5. 3-5 refers to the location of the elements gallium and arsenic on the periodic table. The elements on the third and fifth columns of the periodic table, including nitrogen found in GaN, are known to have special conductive properties, great for producing compound semiconductors. Alan Patz was the first chief executive officer (CEO) of the company, serving from 1985 until 1991.

In 1988, the core group working in the spin-off had to decide if they wanted to continue to work under Tektronix as the GaAs SBU or if they wanted to venture out on their own. This core group met in a hotel room at the Greenwood Inn in Beaverton, Oregon, and decided that they were going to use their experience to start the company that would eventually become TriQuint.

In 1991, Gazelle Microcircuits, Gigabit Logic, and TriQuint all merged under the TriQuint name. The focus of the merged company was to produce components for mobile phones and other communication devices. On May 15, 2001, TriQuint and Sawtek Inc. announced that the two companies would merge. Sawtek made products based on surface acoustic wave, and with the merger, TriQuint was able to incorporate its technology into TriQuint's products. Patz left the CEO position in 1991 and Bert Moyer took over in May as the interim CEO, serving until September when Steve Sharp became the permanent leader of the company.

In 2002, TriQuint acquired Infineon's GaAs semiconductor business as a part of a partnership between the two companies to create products together, followed in late 2002, with the acquisition of a large portion of Agere Systems' optoelectronics business. Also in 2002, Steve Sharp stepped down as CEO and Ralph Quinsey took over the position. TriQuint later sold the TriQuint Optoelectronics Business Unit created from this acquisition to CyOptics in 2005.

In early 2005, TriQuint acquired TFR Technologies, located in Bend, Oregon. TriQuint acquired the company to incorporate its work on bulk acoustic wave (BAW) products into its own work. On September 4, 2007, TriQuint completed the purchase of Peak Devices Inc. in order to incorporate its work on wide band bandwidth into its products. This was followed by the acquisition of WJ Communications, Inc. completed on May 23, 2008, in order to acquire its RF products.

The company settled an investor lawsuit in 2009 over allegations of improper backdating of stock options. TriQuint agreed to pay nearly $3 million in plaintiff's attorneys fees to settle the case, but maintained the company did nothing wrong. Also that year, the company began a patent dispute with rival Avago Technologies over acoustic wave filters, which was eventually settled in 2012 with the companies agreeing to cross-license patents between the companies. Overall, TriQuint spent around $20 million in the case. For fiscal year 2010, the company's revenues had grown to $878.7 million, with about 25 percent of revenues coming from Apple Computer's contract manufacturer Foxconn. After several quarters of losses, the company posted a profit for its third quarter in 2013. TriQuint announced in February 2014 that it would merge with RF Micro Devices. The merger was completed on January 1, 2015, with the new company called Qorvo. TriQuint had traded on the NASDAQ as TQNT prior to the merger.

== Products ==
TriQuint Semiconductor created standard and custom products using gallium arsenide, surface acoustic wave (SAW) and bulk acoustic wave (BAW) technologies. These processes were built to be used in many different devices. In Wireless handsets, TriQuint created many components, including power amplifiers (PA), power amplifier modules (PAM), pHEMT switches, SAW and BAW filters, filter modules, antenna switch modules (ASMs) and front-end modules (FEMs). Their chips were used in the manufacture of Apple's iPhone and iPad, Palm's Pre, HTC's Android G1, and Amazon's Kindle reader, among other consumer products.

TriQuint's GaAs and SAW technology was used inside many base stations. For broadband communications devices, TriQuint created and produced optical modulator drivers, transimpedance amplifiers (TIA), attenuators, Bessel filters, and low-noise amplifiers (LNA). TriQuint's products were also used by the military.

TriQuint also offered foundry services, allowing TriQuint to manufacture its own products. Additionally, the company allowed fabless semiconductor companies to use its facilities for manufacturing.

== See also ==
- List of companies based in Oregon
- Silicon Forest
