= Mike Engelhardt =

American computer programmer

- Education: University of Michigan (1981); University of California, Berkeley (1983)
- Occupations: Computer programmer, author
- Known for: LTspice software

Mike Thomas Engelhardt is an American computer programmer, author, and entrepreneur. He developed the SPICE-based analog electronic circuit simulator computer software known as LTspice and QSPICE.

== Personal life ==
Mike grew up in rural Michigan. His college degrees are: Bachelors in Physics (1981) from University of Michigan (Ann Arbor, Michigan, United States); Masters in Physics (1983) from University of California, Berkeley (Berkeley, California, United States).

He was Director of Simulation Development at Linear Technology, employed from March 1998 to December 2019.

He is currently a managing member of Marcus Aurelius Software, which was started in January 2020.

== Software ==
Mike has written simulators since 1975. The following is a list of software which Mike was either the sole or primary developer:

- 1992 – First known port of SPICE (3E2) to Linux.
- 1998 – SwitcherCAD released internally at Linear Technology.
- 1999 – SwitcherCAD III released to public. It ran on Windows 95, 98, 98SE, ME, NT4.0, 2K, XP.
- 2008 – LTspice IV released. It ran on Windows 2K, XP, Vista, 7. A native macOS 10.7+ application was introduced in 2013.
- 2016 – LTspice XVII released. It ran on 32 or 64-bit Windows 7, 8, 8.1, 10; and macOS 10.9+.
- 2023 – QSPICE beta released. Initially, it is designed to run on Windows 10 and 11.

== Bibliography ==
The following is a list of articles and patents that Engelhardt authored or coauthored.

Articles

- Design and Characteristics of a Lens Spectrometer with Electrostatic Extraction for Electron Beam Probing; Microelectronic Engineering (Elsevier); 6 pages; March 1992.
- Design and Characteristics of a Magnetic Collimating Lens Spectrometer for Electron Beam Probing; Microelectronic Engineering (Elsevier); 6 pages; February 1996.
- SPICE Differentiation; LT Journal of Analog Innovation (Linear Technology); 7 pages; January 2015.

Articles (coauthor)

- Soft X-Ray Photoemission with the SSX-100 Spectrometer; Nuclear Instruments and Methods in Physics Research (Elsevier); 4 pages; May 1986.

Patents

- US Patent 7502723, filed in 2005, "Asymmetric minor hysteresis loop model and circuit simulator including the same".
- US Patent 8686702, filed in 2012, "Negative slope compensation for current mode switching power supply".
- US Patent 10637254, filed in 2015, "Spread spectrum for switch mode power supplies".
- US Patent 9866245, filed in 2016, "Active differential resistors with reduced noise".
- US Patent 10218394, filed in 2017, "Active differential resistors with reduced noise".

Patents (coauthor)

- US Patent 8274266, filed in 2009, "Switch mode power supply with dynamic topology".
- US Patent 9966832, filed in 2017, "Predictive ripple-cancelling signal into error amplifier of switch mode power supply".
- US Patent 10270330, filed in 2018, "Predictive ripple-cancelling signal into error amplifier of switch mode power supply".
