= RFIC =

A radio-frequency integrated circuit, or RFIC, is an electrical integrated circuit operating in a frequency range suitable for wireless transmission. Applications for RFICs include radar and communications.

There is considerable interest in RFIC research due to the cost benefit of shifting as much of the wireless transceiver as possible to a single technology, which in turn would allow for a system on a chip solution as opposed to the more common system-on-package. This interest is bolstered by the pervasiveness of wireless capabilities in electronics. Current research focuses on integrating the RF power amplifier (PA) with CMOS technology, either by using MOSFETs or SiGe HBTs, on RF CMOS mixed-signal integrated circuit chips.

== RFIC-related research conferences ==
RFIC is also used to refer to the annual RFIC Symposium, a research conference held as part of Microwave Week, which is headlined by the International Microwave Symposium. Other peer-reviewed research conferences are listed in the table below.

RFIC-related conferences	Websites for conferences
International Solid-State Circuits Conference	isscc.org
RFIC Symposium	rfic-ieee.org
International MTT Symposia (IMS)	ims-ieee.org
Radio Wireless Week	radiowirelessweek.org
BiCMOS and Compound Semiconductor Integrated Circuits and Technology Symposium	bcicts.org
International Symposium on Circuits and Systems	ieee-cas.org

== Publications featuring RFIC research ==
- IEEE Journal of Solid-State Circuits
- IEEE Transactions on Microwave Theory and Techniques

== See also ==
- RF module
- Radio-frequency identification
