= List of statutory instruments of the United Kingdom, 2009 =

This is a complete list of all 2,008 statutory instruments of the United Kingdom made during 2009.

== 1–100 ==
- The Local Government (Structural Changes) (Further Financial Provisions and Amendment) Regulations (SI 2009/5)
- The Conservation (Natural Habitats, &c.) (Amendment) (England and Wales) Regulations (SI 2009/6)
- The Offshore Marine Conservation (Natural Habitats, &c.) (Amendment) Regulations (SI 2009/7)
- The 5875–5905 MHz Frequency Band (Management) Regulations (SI 2009/11)
- The Safeguarding Vulnerable Groups Act 2006 (Transitory Provisions) Order (SI 2009/12)
- The Wireless Telegraphy (Register) (Amendment) Regulations (SI 2009/14)
- The Wireless Telegraphy (Limitation of Number of Grants of Crown Recognised Spectrum Access) Order (SI 2009/15)
- The Wireless Telegraphy (Crown Recognised Spectrum Access) Regulations (SI 2009/16)
- The Wireless Telegraphy (Recognised Spectrum Access and Licence) (Spectrum Trading) Regulations (SI 2009/17)
- The Civil Enforcement of Parking Contraventions (County of Derbyshire) Designation Order (SI 2009/19)
- The Copyright (Certification of Licensing Scheme for Educational Recording of Broadcasts) (Educational Recording Agency Limited) (Amendment) Order (SI 2009/20)
- The Income Tax Act 2007 (Amendment) Order (SI 2009/23)
- The Civil Enforcement of Parking Contraventions (County of West Sussex) (Adur District) Designation Order (SI 2009/24)
- The Education (Admissions Appeals Arrangements) (England) (Amendment) Regulations (SI 2009/25)
- The General Chiropractic Council (Constitution of the Statutory Committees) Rules Order of Council (SI 2009/26)
- The General Chiropractic Council (Registration of Chiropractors with United Kingdom Qualifications that are not Recognised Qualifications) Rules Order of Council (SI 2009/27)
- The Feeding Stuffs (England) (Amendment) Regulations (SI 2009/28)
- The National Health Service (Charges for Drugs and Appliances) Amendment Regulations (SI 2009/29)
- The Income-related Benefits (Subsidy to Authorities) Amendment Order (SI 2009/30)
- The Offender Management Act 2007 (Commencement No. 3) Order (SI 2009/32)
- The Home Information Pack (Amendment) Regulations (SI 2009/34)
- The Stamp Duty and Stamp Duty Reserve Tax (Investment Exchanges and Clearing Houses) Regulations (SI 2009/35)
- The Building Societies (Funding) and Mutual Societies (Transfers) Act 2007 (Commencement No. 1) Order (SI 2009/36)
- The Safeguarding Vulnerable Groups Act 2006 (Prescribed Criteria and Miscellaneous Provisions) Regulations (SI 2009/37)
- The Health Protection (Vaccination) Regulations (SI 2009/38)
- The Safeguarding Vulnerable Groups Act 2006 (Commencement No. 3) Order (SI 2009/39)
- The Local Government (Assistants for Political Groups) (Remuneration) (Wales) Order (SI 2009/40)
- The Operation of Air Services in the Community Regulations (SI 2009/41)
- The Barking, Havering and Redbridge Hospitals National Health Service Trust (Establishment) Amendment Order (SI 2009/43)
- The Energy Act 2008 (Commencement No. 1 and Savings) Order (SI 2009/45)
- The Water (Prevention of Pollution) (Code of Good Agricultural Practice) (England) Order (SI 2009/46)
- The Environmental Noise (Wales) (Amendment) Regulations (SI 2009/47)
- The Education (Maintained Special Schools) (Wales) (Amendment) Regulations (SI 2009/48)
- The Education and Inspections Act 2006 (Commencement No. 2) (Wales) Order (SI 2009/49)
- The A46 Trunk Road (Newark to Widmerpool Improvement and Slip Roads) Order (SI 2009/50)
- The A52 Trunk Road (A46 Newark to Widmerpool Improvement and Slip Roads) Order (SI 2009/51)
- The A46 Trunk Road (Newark to Widmerpool Improvement and Slip Roads) (Detrunking) Order (SI 2009/52)
- The A52 Trunk Road (A46 Newark to Widmerpool Improvement and Slip Roads) (Detrunking) Order (SI 2009/53)
- The National Health Service (Travelling Expenses and Remission of Charges) (Wales) (Amendment) Regulations (SI 2009/54)
- The Local Authorities (Charges for Property Searches) (Disapplication) (Wales) Order (SI 2009/55)
- The Transfer of Tribunal Functions and Revenue and Customs Appeals Order (SI 2009/56)
- The Counter-Terrorism Act 2008 (Commencement No. 2) Order (SI 2009/58)
- The Road Tunnel Safety (Amendment) Regulations (SI 2009/64)
- The Wireless Telegraphy (Vehicle Based Intelligent Transport Systems) (Exemption) Regulations (SI 2009/65)
- The Wireless Telegraphy (Licence Charges) (Amendment) Regulations (SI 2009/66)
- OGCbuying.solutions Trading Fund (Extension and Amendment) Order (SI 2009/81)
- The Pensions Act 2008 (Commencement No. 2) Order (SI 2009/82)
- The Penalties for Disorderly Behaviour (Amount of Penalty) (Amendment) Order (SI 2009/83)

== 101–200 ==
- The Street Works (Inspection Fees) (England) (Amendment) Regulations (SI 2009/104)
- The Joint Waste Authorities (Proposals) Regulations (SI 2009/105)
- The Feeding Stuffs (Wales) (Amendment) Regulations (SI 2009/106)
- The Local Transport Act 2008 (Commencement No. 1 and Transitional Provisions) Order (SI 2009/107)
- The School Milk (Wales) (Amendment) Regulations (SI 2009/108)
- The Regional Transport Planning (Wales) (Amendment) Order (SI 2009/109)
- The Criminal Justice and Police Act 2001 (Amendment) Order (SI 2009/110)
- The Social Security (Contributions) (Amendment) Regulations (SI 2009/111)
- The National Health Service (Functions of Strategic Health Authorities and Primary Care Trusts and Administration Arrangements) (England) (Amendment) Regulations (SI 2009/112)
- The Financial Services and Markets Act 2000 (Exemption) (Amendment) Order (SI 2009/118)
- The Local Government (Structural Changes) (Areas and Membership of Public Bodies in Bedfordshire and Cheshire) Order (SI 2009/119)
- The Contracting Out (Administrative Work of Tribunals) Order (SI 2009/121)
- The Family Provision (Intestate Succession) Order (SI 2009/135)
- The Hill Farm Allowance Regulations (SI 2009/138)
- The Mental Health Act 2007 (Commencement No.10 and Transitional Provisions) Order (SI 2009/139)
- The Criminal Justice and Immigration Act 2008 (Commencement No. 6 and Transitional Provisions) Order (SI 2009/140)
- The Public Service Vehicles (Conditions of Fitness, Equipment, Use and Certification) (Amendment) Regulations (SI 2009/141)
- The Road Vehicles (Construction and Use) (Amendment) Regulations (SI 2009/142)
- The Public Service Vehicles Accessibility (Amendment) Regulations (SI 2009/143)
- The Environmental Damage (Prevention and Remediation) Regulations (SI 2009/153)
- The European Parliamentary Elections (Amendment) Regulations (SI 2009/186)
- The Aerodromes (Designation) (Chargeable Air Services) (Revocation) Order (SI 2009/189)
- The European Parliament (Disqualification)(United Kingdom and Gibraltar) Order (SI 2009/190)
- The Transmissible Spongiform Encephalopathies (Wales)(Amendment) Regulations (SI 2009/192)
- The Air Passenger Duty (Rate) (Qualifying Territories) (Variation of Description) Order (SI 2009/193)
- The Stamp Duty and Stamp Duty Reserve Tax (Investment Exchanges and Clearing Houses) Regulations (No. 2) (SI 2009/194)
- The First-tier Tribunal and Upper Tribunal (Chambers) (Amendment) Order (SI 2009/196)
- The Sites of Special Scientific Interest (Appeals) Regulations (SI 2009/197)
- The Immigration (Passenger Transit Visa) (Amendment) Order (SI 2009/198)
- The Taxes (Interest Rate) (Amendment) Regulations (SI 2009/199)
- The Occupational Pension Schemes (Levy Ceiling – Earnings Percentage Increase) Order (SI 2009/200)

== 201–300 ==
- The Welsh Ambulance Services National Health Service Trust (Establishment) (Amendment) Order (SI 2009/201)
- The Companies Act 2006 (Amendment of Schedule 2) Order (SI 2009/202)
- The Police Act 1997 (Criminal Records) (Electronic Communications) Order (SI 2009/203)
- The Non-Domestic Rating (Collection and Enforcement) (Local Lists) (Amendment) (England) Regulations (SI 2009/204)
- The Plastic Materials and Articles in Contact with Food (England) Regulations (SI 2009/205)
- The Local Authorities (Alteration of Requisite Calculations) (England) Regulations (SI 2009/206)
- The Gambling Act 2005 (Variation of Monetary Limit) Order (SI 2009/207)
- The National Insurance Contributions (Application of Part 7 of the Finance Act 2004) (Amendment) Regulations (SI 2009/208)
- The Payment Services Regulations (SI 2009/209)
- The School Admissions Code (Appointed Day) (England) Order (SI 2009/210)
- The School Admission Appeals Code (Appointed Day) (England) Order (SI 2009/211)
- The Criminal Defence Service (Information Requests) (Prescribed Benefits) Regulations (SI 2009/212)
- The Education (Individual Pupil Information) (Prescribed Persons) (Amendment) (England) Regulations (SI 2009/213)
- The Companies (Disclosure of Address) Regulations (SI 2009/214)
- The Value Added Tax (Place of Supply of Goods) Order (SI 2009/215)
- The Ozone-Depleting Substances (Qualifications) Regulations (SI 2009/216)
- The Value Added Tax (Input Tax) (Amendment) Order (SI 2009/217)
- The Companies (Trading Disclosures) (Amendment) Regulations (SI 2009/218)
- The Insurance Premium Tax (Amendment of Schedule 6A to the Finance Act 1994) Order (SI 2009/219)
- The European Communities (Definition of Treaties) (Agreements concluded under Article XXI GATS) Order (SI 2009/220)
- The European Communities (Designation) Order (SI 2009/221)
- The London Summit (Immunities and Privileges) Order (SI 2009/222)
- The Gas Importation and Storage Zone (Designation of Area) Order (SI 2009/223)
- The Judicial Committee (Appellate Jurisdiction) Rules Order (SI 2009/224)
- The Postponement of Local Elections (Northern Ireland) Order (SI 2009/225)
- The Double Taxation Relief and International Tax Enforcement (Taxes on Income and Capital) (France) Order (SI 2009/226)
- The Double Taxation Relief and International Tax Enforcement (Taxes on Income and Capital) (Netherlands) Order (SI 2009/227)
- The Double Taxation Relief and International Tax Enforcement (Taxes on Income and Capital) (Isle of Man) Order (SI 2009/228)
- The Secretary of State for Energy and Climate Change Order (SI 2009/229)
- The Non-Domestic Rating (Unoccupied Property) (Wales) (Amendment) Regulations (SI 2009/255)
- The Northern Ireland Assembly (Elections) (Amendment) Order (SI 2009/256)
- The Street Works (Inspection Fees) (Wales) (Amendment) Regulations (SI 2009/258)
- The Control of Salmonella in Broiler Flocks Order (SI 2009/260)
- The Fluorinated Greenhouse Gases Regulations (SI 2009/261)
- The Armed Forces (Pensions)(Prescribed Modification) Order (SI 2009/262)
- The General Osteopathic Council (Constitution) Order (SI 2009/263)
- The Financial Services and Markets Act 2000 (Exemption) (Amendment) (No. 2) Order (SI 2009/264)
- The Safeguarding Vulnerable Groups Act 2006 (Devolution Alignment) Order (SI 2009/265)
- The Mental Capacity (Deprivation of Liberty: Appointment of Relevant Person's Representative) (Wales) Regulations (SI 2009/266)
- The Local Authorities (Alteration of Requisite Calculations) (Wales) Regulations (SI 2009/267)
- The Children and Young Persons Act 2008 (Commencement No. 1 and Saving Provision) Order (SI 2009/268)
- The Harbour Works (Environmental Impact Assessment) (Amendment) (England and Wales) Regulations (SI 2009/269)
- The Health and Social Care Act 2008 (Commencement No.8) Order (SI 2009/270)
- The Flood Defence (Robertsbridge Works) Order (SI 2009/271)
- The Health Professions Council (Registration and Fees) (Amendment) Rules Order of Council (SI 2009/272)
- The Tribunal Procedure (First-tier Tribunal) (Tax Chamber) Rules (SI 2009/273)
- The Tribunal Procedure (Amendment) Rules (SI 2009/274)
- The Appeals (Excluded Decisions) Order (SI 2009/275)
- The Local Government (Structural Changes) (Further Transitional and Supplementary Provision and Miscellaneous Amendments) Regulations (SI 2009/276)
- The Statistics and Registration Service Act 2007 (Disclosure of Pupil Information) (England) Regulations (SI 2009/277)
- The NHS Bodies and Local Authorities Partnership Arrangements (Amendment) Regulations (SI 2009/278)
- The Medical Profession (Miscellaneous Amendments) Order 2008 (Commencement No. 1) Order of Council (SI 2009/280)
- The Northern Ireland Arms Decommissioning Act 1997 (Amnesty Period) Order (SI 2009/281)
- The A19 Trunk Road (A19/A63 Junction at Barlby to A19/A63 Junction at Selby Crossroads) (Detrunking) Order (SI 2009/282)
- The A63 Liverpool-Leeds-Hull Trunk Road (North & West Yorkshire) (Revocation and Detrunking) Order (SI 2009/283)
- The A40 Trunk Road (Gloucestershire Border to Ross-on-Wye, Herefordshire) (Detrunking) Order (SI 2009/284)
- The Healthy Start Scheme and Welfare Food (Amendment) Regulations (SI 2009/295)
- The Banking Act 2009 (Commencement No. 1) Order (SI 2009/296)

== 301–400 ==
- The Street Works (Charges for Unreasonably Prolonged Occupation of the Highway) (England) Regulations (SI 2009/303)
- The Civil Enforcement of Parking Contraventions (County of Worcestershire) (Borough of Redditch) Designation Order (SI 2009/305)
- The Civil Enforcement of Parking Contraventions (County of Staffordshire) (Districts of Cannock Chase, Lichfield, South Staffordshire and Tamworth) Designation Order (SI 2009/306)
- The Gangmasters (Licensing Conditions) Rules (SI 2009/307)
- The Kaupthing Singer & Friedlander Limited Transfer of Certain Rights and Liabilities (Amendment) Order (SI 2009/308)
- The Local Authority Social Services and National Health Service Complaints (England) Regulations (SI 2009/309)
- The Heritable Bank plc Transfer of Certain Rights and Liabilities (Amendment) Order (SI 2009/310)
- The National Health Service (Optical Charges and Payments) (Amendment) (Wales) Regulations (SI 2009/311)
- The Banking Act 2009 (Bank Administration) (Modification for Application to Banks in Temporary Public Ownership) Regulations (SI 2009/312)
- The Banking Act 2009 (Bank Administration) (Modification for Application to Multiple Transfers) Regulations (SI 2009/313)
- The Bank Administration (Sharing Information) Regulations (SI 2009/314)
- The Personal Injuries (NHS Charges) Amendment Regulations (SI 2009/316)
- The Banking Act 2009 (Parts 2 and 3 Consequential Amendments) Order (SI 2009/317)
- The Health and Safety at Work etc. Act 1974 (Application to Environmentally Hazardous Substances) (Amendment) Regulations (SI 2009/318)
- The Banking Act 2009 (Third Party Compensation Arrangements for Partial Property Transfers) Regulations (SI 2009/319)
- The Bradford & Bingley plc Transfer of Securities and Property etc. (Amendment) Order (SI 2009/320)
- The Local Authorities (Capital Finance and Accounting) (England) (Amendment) Regulations (SI 2009/321)
- The Banking Act 2009 (Restriction of Partial Property Transfers) Order (SI 2009/322)
- The Children and Young Persons Act 2008 (Commencement No. 1) (England) Order (SI 2009/323)
- The Gambling Act 2005 (Gaming Machines in Bingo Premises) Order (SI 2009/324)
- The Pensions Act 2004 (Commencement No.12) Order (SI 2009/325)
- The Civil Enforcement of Parking Contraventions (City of Bradford) Designation Order (SI 2009/326)
- The Bank Administration (Scotland) Rules (SI 2009/350)
- The Bank Insolvency (Scotland) Rules (SI 2009/351)
- The Exercise of Functions by Local Councillors (Written Records) Regulations (SI 2009/352)
- The Non-Domestic Rating (Unoccupied Property) (England) Regulations (SI 2009/353)
- The Non-Domestic Rating (Small Business Rate Relief) (England) (Amendment) Order (SI 2009/354)
- The Council Tax and Non-Domestic Rating (Demand Notices) (England) (Amendment) Regulations (SI 2009/355)
- The Bank Insolvency (England and Wales) Rules (SI 2009/356)
- The Bank Administration (England and Wales) Rules (SI 2009/357)
- The Allocation of Housing and Homelessness (Eligibility) (England) (Amendment) Regulations (SI 2009/358)
- The Water Act 2003 (Commencement No. 9 and Saving Provisions) (England) Order (SI 2009/359)
- The European Fisheries Fund (Grants) (Wales) Regulations (SI 2009/360)
- The Social Security (Habitual Residence) (Amendment) Regulations (SI 2009/362)
- The Housing and Regeneration Act 2008 (Commencement No. 3) Order (SI 2009/363)
- The Rotherham Doncaster and South Humber Mental Health NHS Foundation Trust (Transfer of Trust Property) Order (SI 2009/364)
- The Section 19 Permit Regulations (SI 2009/365)
- The Community Bus Regulations (SI 2009/366)
- The County of the Isle of Anglesey (Holyhead, Trearddur, Cwm Cadnant, Penmynydd, Pentraeth and Llanfair-Mathafarn-Eithaf Communities) Order (SI 2009/367)
- The Local Authorities (Charges for Property Searches)(Wales) Regulations (SI 2009/369)
- The Learner Travel (Wales) Measure 2008 (Commencement No. 1) Order (SI 2009/371)
- The Blood Safety and Quality (Fees Amendment) Regulations (SI 2009/372)
- The Safety of Sports Grounds (Designation) Order (SI 2009/373)
- The Town and Country Planning (Determination of Appeals by Appointed Persons) (Prescribed Classes) (Amendment) (England) Regulations (SI 2009/380)
- The National Health Service Pension Scheme and Injury Benefits (Amendment) Regulations (SI 2009/381)
- The Tribunals, Courts and Enforcement Act 2007 (Commencement No. 7) Order (SI 2009/382)
- The Medical Devices (Fees Amendments) Regulations (SI 2009/383)
- The Planning and Compulsory Purchase Act 2004 (Commencement No.11) Order (SI 2009/384)
- The Postgraduate Medical Education and Training Board (Fees) Rules Order (SI 2009/385)
- The Wine Regulations (SI 2009/386)
- The Education and Skills Act 2008 (Commencement No. 2 and Savings) Order (SI 2009/387)
- The Companies (Shares and Share Capital) Order (SI 2009/388)
- The Medicines (Products for Human Use) (Fees) Regulations (SI 2009/389)
- The Animals and Animal Products (Import and Export) (Wales) (Amendment) Regulations (SI 2009/390)
- The Criminal Defence Service (Information Requests) Regulations (SI 2009/391)
- The Products of Animal Origin (Third Country Imports) (Wales) (Amendment) Regulations (SI 2009/392)
- The Allocation of Housing and Homelessness (Eligibility) (Wales) Regulations (SI 2009/393)
- The Fostering Services (Amendment) Regulations (SI 2009/394)
- The Independent Review of Determinations (Adoption and Fostering) Regulations (SI 2009/395)
- The Child Support (Miscellaneous Amendments) Regulations (SI 2009/396)
- The Stamp Duty and Stamp Duty Reserve Tax (Investment Exchanges and Clearing Houses) Regulations (No. 3) (SI 2009/397)
- The Plant Health (Import Inspection Fees) (Wales) (Amendment) Regulations (SI 2009/398)
- The Planning Act 2008 (Commencement No. 1 and Savings) Order (SI 2009/400)

== 401–500 ==
- Town and Country Planning (Local Development) (England) (Amendment) Regulations 2009 (SI 2009/401)
- Finance Act 2008, Schedule 37 (Appointed Day) Order 2009 (SI 2009/402)
- Finance Act 2008, Schedule 39 (Appointed Day, Transitional Provision and Savings) Order 2009 (SI 2009/403)
- Finance Act 2008, Schedule 36 (Appointed Day and Savings) Order 2009 (SI 2009/404)
- Finance Act 2008, Section 119 (Appointed Day) Order 2009 (SI 2009/405)
- Pensions Act 2007 (Commencement No. 3) Order 2009 (SI 2009/406)
- National Health Service (Dental Charges) Amendment Regulations 2009 (SI 2009/407)
- Parole Board (Amendment) Rules 2009 (SI 2009/408)
- National Health Service (Amendments Relating to Optical Charges and Payments) Regulations 2009 (SI 2009/409)
- Care Quality Commission (Additional Functions) Regulations 2009 (SI 2009/410)
- National Health Service (Charges for Drugs and Appliances) and (Travel Expenses and Remission of Charges) Amendment Regulations 2009 (SI 2009/411)
- Housing and Regeneration Act 2008 (Commencement No. 1 and Saving Provisions) Order 2009 (SI 2009/415)
- Immigration and Nationality (Fees) (Amendment) Order 2009 (SI 2009/420)
- Immigration and Nationality (Cost Recovery Fees) Regulations 2009 (SI 2009/421)
- Pensions (Polish Forces) Scheme (Amendment) Order 2009 (SI 2009/436)
- Personal Injuries (Civilians) (Amendment) Scheme 2009 (SI 2009/438)
- Civil Enforcement of Parking Contraventions (Walsall) Designation Order 2009 (SI 2009/439)
- Control of Salmonella in Broiler Flocks (Wales) Order 2009 (SI 2009/441)
- General Optical Council (Constitution) Order 2009 (SI 2009/442)
- Public Service Vehicles (Registration Restrictions) (England and Wales) Regulations 2009 (SI 2009/443)
- Education (Budget Statements) (England) (Amendment) Regulations 2009 (SI 2009/444)
- Quality Partnership Schemes (England) Regulations 2009 (SI 2009/445)
- Justice and Security (Northern Ireland) Act 2007 (Commencement No. 3) Order 2009 (SI 2009/446)
- Local Government Pension Scheme (Administration) (Amendment) Regulations 2009 (SI 2009/447)
- Northern Ireland (Miscellaneous Provisions) Act 2006 (Commencement No. 5) Order 2009 (SI 2009/448)
- Smoke Control Areas (Exempted Fireplaces) (England) Order 2009 (SI 2009/449)
- Tribunals, Courts and Enforcement Act 2007 (Transitional Provision) Order 2009 (SI 2009/450)
- Pension Protection Fund (Miscellaneous Amendments) Regulations 2009 (SI 2009/451)
- Town and Country Planning (Appeals) (Written Representations Procedure) (England) Regulations 2009 (SI 2009/452)
- Town and Country Planning (General Development Procedure) (Amendment) (England) Order 2009 (SI 2009/453)
- Town and Country Planning (Determination of Appeal Procedure) (Prescribed Period) (England) Regulations 2009 (SI 2009/454)
- Town and Country Planning (Hearings and Inquiries Procedures) (England) (Amendment) Rules 2009 (SI 2009/455)
- National Health Service (Dental Charges, General Dental Services Contracts and Personal Dental Services Agreements) (Wales) (Amendment) Regulations 2009 (SI 2009/456)
- Debt Relief Orders (Designation of Competent Authorities) Regulations 2009 (SI 2009/457)
- Immigration Services Commissioner (Designated Professional Body) (Fees) Order 2009 (SI 2009/458)
- Pensions Appeal Commissioners (Procedure) (Northern Ireland) (Amendment) Regulations 2009 (SI 2009/459)
- Police Act 1997 (Criminal Records) Regulations 2009 (SI 2009/460)
- Non-Domestic Rating (Collection and Enforcement) (Local Lists) (Amendment) (Wales) Regulations 2009 (SI 2009/461)
- Health and Social Care Act 2008 (Commencement No. 9, Consequential Amendments and Transitory, Transitional and Saving Provisions) Order 2009 (SI 2009/462)
- Aquatic Animal Health (England and Wales) Regulations 2009 (SI 2009/463)
- Civil Enforcement of Parking Contraventions (West Berkshire) Designation Order 2009 (SI 2009/464)
- Insolvency Proceedings (Monetary Limits) (Amendment) Order 2009 (SI 2009/465)
- Building (Amendment) Regulations 2009 (SI 2009/466)
- Charter Trustees Regulations 2009 (SI 2009/467)
- General Osteopathic Council (Constitution of the Statutory Committees) Rules Order of Council 2009 (SI 2009/468)
- Driving Standards Agency Trading Fund (Maximum Borrowing etc.) Order 2009 (SI 2009/469)
- Education (Student Loans) (Repayment) Regulations 2009 (SI 2009/470)
- Social Security (National Insurance Number Information: Exemption) Regulations 2009 (SI 2009/471)
- Further Education (Principals' Qualifications) (England) (Amendment) Regulations 2009 (SI 2009/472)
- Accounts and Audit (Amendment) (England) Regulations 2009 (SI 2009/473)
- Register of Judgments, Orders and Fines (Amendment) Regulations 2009 (SI 2009/474)
- Child Trust Funds (Amendment) Regulations 2009 (SI 2009/475)
- Government Resources and Accounts Act 2000 (Audit of Non-profit-making Companies) Order 2009 (SI 2009/476)
- Guaranteed Minimum Pensions Increase Order 2009 (SI 2009/477)
- Civil Enforcement of Parking Contraventions (England) General (Amendment) Regulations 2009 (SI 2009/478)
- Human Fertilisation and Embryology Act 2008 (Commencement No. 1 and Transitional Provisions) Order 2009 (SI 2009/479)
- Social Security (Flexible New Deal) Regulations 2009 (SI 2009/480)
- Plastic Materials and Articles in Contact with Food (Wales) Regulations 2009 (SI 2009/481)
- Insolvency (Amendment) Regulations 2009 (SI 2009/482)
- Fixed Penalty Offences Order 2009 (SI 2009/483)
- Housing Corporation (Dissolution) Order 2009 (SI 2009/484)
- Local Government (Structural Changes) (Further Transitional Arrangements and Staffing) Regulations 2009 (SI 2009/486)
- Insolvency Practitioners and Insolvency Services Account (Fees) (Amendment) Order 2009 (SI 2009/487)
- Fixed Penalty (Amendment) Order 2009 (SI 2009/488)
- Gender Recognition (Application Fees) (Amendment) Order 2009 (SI 2009/489)
- Dormant Bank and Building Society Accounts Act 2008 (Commencement and Transitional Provisions) Order 2009 (SI 2009/490)
- Road Safety (Financial Penalty Deposit) Order 2009 (SI 2009/491)
- Road Safety (Financial Penalty Deposit) (Appropriate Amount) Order 2009 (SI 2009/492)
- Road Safety (Immobilisation, Removal and Disposal of Vehicles) Regulations 2009 (SI 2009/493)
- Fixed Penalty (Procedure) (Amendment) Regulations 2009 (SI 2009/494)
- Fixed Penalty (Procedure) (Vehicle Examiners) Regulations 2009 (SI 2009/495)
- Control of Trade in Endangered Species (Fees) Regulations 2009 (SI 2009/496)
- Social Security Benefits Up-rating Order 2009 (SI 2009/497)
- Road Safety (Financial Penalty Deposit) (Interest) Order 2009 (SI 2009/498)
- Park Lane College, Leeds, Leeds Thomas Danby College, and Leeds Technology College (Dissolution) Order 2009 (SI 2009/499)
- Solicitors' Recognised Bodies (Amendment) Order 2009 (SI 2009/500)

== 501–600 ==
- The Licensed Conveyancers (Compensation for Inadequate Professional Services) Order (SI 2009/501)
- The Community Legal Service (Financial) (Amendment) Regulations (SI 2009/502)
- The Legal Services Act 2007 (Commencement No. 4, Transitory and Transitional Provisions and Appointed Day) Order (SI 2009/503)
- The Offender Management Act 2007 (Establishment of Probation Trusts) Order (SI 2009/504)
- The Communications (Television Licensing) (Amendment) Regulations (SI 2009/505)
- The Immigration and Asylum Act 1999 (Part V Exemption: Licensed Sponsors Tiers 2 and 4) Order (SI 2009/506)
- The Hazardous Waste (England and Wales) (Amendment) Regulations (SI 2009/507)
- The Charities Acts 1992 and 1993 (Substitution of Sums) Order (SI 2009/508)
- The Mutual Societies (Transfers) Order (SI 2009/509)
- The Designation of Schools Having a Religious Character (Independent Schools) (England) Order (SI 2009/510)
- The Finance Act 2008, Schedule 41 (Appointed Day and Transitional Provisions) Order (SI 2009/511)
- The Approval of Code of Management Practice (Residential Management) (Service Charges) (England) Order (SI 2009/512)
- The Court of Protection Fees (Amendment) Order (SI 2009/513)
- The Public Guardian (Fees, etc.) (Amendment) Regulations (SI 2009/514)
- The Health and Safety (Fees) Regulations (SI 2009/515)
- The County of Shropshire (Electoral Changes) Order (SI 2009/529)
- The County of West Sussex (Electoral Changes) Order (SI 2009/530)
- The County of Wiltshire (Electoral Changes) Order (SI 2009/531)
- The Tewkesbury (Related Alterations) Order (SI 2009/532)
- The Stratford-on-Avon (Related Alterations) Order (SI 2009/533)
- The Financial Services and Markets Act 2000 (Controllers) Regulations (SI 2009/534)
- The Berwick-upon-Tweed (Related Alterations) Order (SI 2009/535)
- The Aylesbury Vale (Parish Electoral Arrangements and Electoral Changes) (Amendment) Order (SI 2009/536)
- The Scotland Act 1998 (Designation of Receipts) Order (SI 2009/537)
- The North Norfolk (Related Alterations) Order (SI 2009/538)
- The Wellingborough (Related Alterations) Order (SI 2009/539)
- The Pendle (Related Alterations) Order (SI 2009/540)
- The Amber Valley (Related Alterations) Order (SI 2009/541)
- The Mid Devon (Related Alterations) Order (SI 2009/542)
- The East Devon (Related Alterations) Order (SI 2009/543)
- The Armed Forces Pension Scheme etc. (Amendment) Order (SI 2009/544)
- The Patents, Trade Marks and Designs (Address for Service) Rules (SI 2009/546)
- The Offender Management Act 2007 (Commencement No. 4) Order (SI 2009/547)
- The Industrial Training Levy (Engineering Construction Industry Training Board) Order (SI 2009/548)
- The Industrial Training Levy (Construction Industry Training Board) Order (SI 2009/549)
- The Regulatory Enforcement and Sanctions Act 2008 (Commencement No 2) Order (SI 2009/550)
- The Textile Products (Indications of Fibre Content) (Amendment) Regulations (SI 2009/551)
- The Open-Ended Investment Companies (Amendment) Regulations (SI 2009/553)
- The Prevention of Terrorism Act 2005 (Continuance in force of sections 1 to 9) Order (SI 2009/554)
- The Unit Trusts (Electronic Communications) Order (SI 2009/555)
- The Energy Act 2008 (Consequential Amendments) Order (SI 2009/556)
- The National Park Authorities (Amendment) (England) Order (SI 2009/557)
- The Monkseaton Community High School (Governing Body Procedures) (Amendment) Order (SI 2009/558)
- The Energy Act 2008 (Commencement No. 2) Order (SI 2009/559)
- The Local Authorities (Capital Finance and Accounting) (Wales) (Amendment) Regulations (SI 2009/560)
- The Learner Travel Information (Wales) Regulations (SI 2009/569)
- Her Majesty's Chief Inspector of Prisons (Specified Public Authority) Order (SI 2009/570)
- The Finance Act 2008, Schedule 40 (Appointed Day, Transitional Provisions and Consequential Amendments) Order (SI 2009/571)
- The Changing of School Session Times (Wales) Regulations (SI 2009/572)
- The Copeland (Parishes) Order (SI 2009/574)
- The Travel Concessions (Eligible Services) (Amendment) Order (SI 2009/575)
- The Contracted-Out Prisons (Specification of Restricted Activities) Order (SI 2009/576)
- The High Court and County Courts Jurisdiction (Amendment) Order (SI 2009/577)
- The Proscribed Organisations (Name Change) Order (SI 2009/578)
- The Local Transport Act 2008 (Commencement No. 1 and Transitional Provisions) (Wales) Order (SI 2009/579)
- The Health and Social Care Act 2008 (Commencement No.9, Consequential Amendments and Transitory, Transitional and Saving Provisions) Amendment Order (SI 2009/580)
- The Restriction of the Use of Certain Hazardous Substances in Electrical and Electronic Equipment (Amendment) Regulations (SI 2009/581)
- The Court of Protection (Amendment) Rules (SI 2009/582)
- The Social Security (Miscellaneous Amendments) Regulations (SI 2009/583)
- The Electronic Communications Code (Conditions and Restrictions) (Amendment) Regulations (SI 2009/584)
- The Export of Radioactive Sources (Control) (Amendment) Order (SI 2009/585)
- The Value Added Tax (Amendment) Regulations (SI 2009/586)
- The Plant Health (England) (Amendment) Order (SI 2009/587)
- The Income Tax (Pay As You Earn) (Amendment) Regulations (SI 2009/588)
- The National Health Service (Amendments relating to Optical Charges and Payments) (Wales) Regulations (SI 2009/589)
- The Discipline of Judges (Designation) Order (SI 2009/590)
- The Social Security (Contributions) (Amendment No. 2) Regulations (SI 2009/591)
- The Transfer of Undertakings (Protection of Employment) (Amendment) Regulations (SI 2009/592)
- The Social Security (Contributions) (Re-rating) Order (SI 2009/593)
- The Plant Health (Forestry) (Amendment) Order (SI 2009/594)
- The Flexible Working (Eligibility, Complaints and Remedies) (Amendment) Regulations (SI 2009/595)
- The Civil Enforcement of Parking Contraventions (City of Newcastle upon Tyne) Designation Order (SI 2009/596)
- The National Assistance (Sums for Personal Requirements and Assessment of Resources) Amendment (England) Regulations (SI 2009/597)
- The Pensions Act 2008 (Abolition of Safeguarded Rights) (Consequential) Order (SI 2009/598)
- The National Health Service (Pharmaceutical Services and Local Pharmaceutical Services) Amendment Regulations (SI 2009/599)
- The Social Security (Contributions) (Amendment No. 3) Regulations (SI 2009/600)

== 601–700 ==
- The Housing (Purchase of Equitable Interests) (England) Regulations (SI 2009/601)
- The Housing (Service Charge Loans) (Amendment) (England) Regulations (SI 2009/602)
- The Employment Act 2008 (Commencement No. 2, Transitional Provisions and Savings) Order (SI 2009/603)
- The Social Security (Claims and Payments) Amendment Regulations (SI 2009/604)
- The Factories Act 1961 and Offices, Shops and Railway Premises Act 1963 (Repeals and Modifications) Regulations (SI 2009/605)
- The Health and Safety Information for Employees (Amendment) Regulations (SI 2009/606)
- The Social Security Benefits Up-rating Regulations (SI 2009/607)
- The Social Security Revaluation of Earnings Factors Order (SI 2009/608)
- The Social Security (Transitional Payments) Regulations (SI 2009/609)
- The Social Security Pensions (Low Earnings Threshold) Order (SI 2009/610)
- The Tax Avoidance Schemes (Information) (Amendment) Regulations (SI 2009/611)
- The National Insurance Contributions (Application of Part 7 of the Finance Act 2004) (Amendment) (No. 2) Regulations (SI 2009/612)
- The Crime (International Co-operation) Act 2003 (Designation of Participating Countries) (England, Wales and Northern Ireland) Order (SI 2009/613)
- The Housing Benefit (Amendment) Regulations (SI 2009/614)
- The Occupational, Personal and Stakeholder Pensions (Miscellaneous Amendments) Regulations (SI 2009/615)
- The Criminal Justice Act 2003 (Commencement No.8 and Transitional and Saving Provisions) (Amendment) Order (SI 2009/616)
- The Pensions Regulator (Miscellaneous Amendment) Regulations (SI 2009/617)
- The Dudley and Walsall Mental Health Partnership National Health Service Trust (Originating Capital) Order (SI 2009/618)
- The Polygraph Rules (SI 2009/619)
- The Health and Social Care Act 2008 (Commencement No. 1) (Wales) Order (SI 2009/631)
- The National Assistance (Assessment of Resources and Sums for Personal Requirements) (Amendment) (Wales) Regulations (SI 2009/632)
- The Private Security Industry Act 2001 (Approved Contractor Scheme) Regulations 2007 (Amendment) Regulations (SI 2009/633)
- The Private Security Industry Act 2001 (Licences) Regulations 2007 (Amendment) Regulations (SI 2009/634)
- The Private Security Industry Act 2001 (Duration of Licence)(No.2) Order 2006 (Amendment) Order (SI 2009/635)
- The Family Proceedings (Amendment) Rules (SI 2009/636)
- The Family Proceedings Courts (Children Act 1989) (Amendment) Rules (SI 2009/637)
- The Family Procedure (Adoption) (Amendment) Rules (SI 2009/638)
- The Electricity Safety, Quality and Continuity (Amendment) Regulations (SI 2009/639)
- The Overhead Lines (Exemption) (England and Wales) Regulations (SI 2009/640)
- The Asylum Support (Amendment) (Revocation) Regulations (SI 2009/641)
- The Insolvency (Amendment) Rules (SI 2009/642)
- The Motor Vehicles (Tests) (Amendment) Regulations (SI 2009/643)
- The Private Security Industry Act 2001 (Commencement No.1) (Northern Ireland) Order (SI 2009/644)
- The Insolvency Proceedings (Fees) (Amendment) Order (SI 2009/645)
- The Education (School Performance Information) (England) (Amendment) Regulations (SI 2009/646)
- The Buying Agency Trading Fund (Amendment) Order (SI 2009/647)
- The Electricity and Gas Appeals (Designation and Exclusion) Order (SI 2009/648)
- The Health and Social Care (Financial Assistance) Regulations (SI 2009/649)
- The Social Security (Additional Class 3 National Insurance Contributions) Amendment Regulations (SI 2009/659)
- The Health and Social Care Act 2008 (Registration of Regulated Activities) Regulations (SI 2009/660)
- The Social Security (Industrial Injuries) (Dependency) (Permitted Earnings Limits) Order (SI 2009/661)
- The Insolvency (Scotland) Amendment Rules (SI 2009/662)
- The Weights and Measures (Specified Quantities) (Pre-packed Products) Regulations (SI 2009/663)
- The Workmen's Compensation (Supplementation) (Amendment) Scheme (SI 2009/664)
- The Co-ordination of Regulatory Enforcement (Enforcement Action) Order (SI 2009/665)
- The Health Care and Associated Professions (Miscellaneous Amendments) Order 2008 (Commencement No. 2) (Amendment) Order of Council (SI 2009/666)
- The Education (Recognised Bodies) (Wales) (Amendment) Order (SI 2009/667)
- The Co-ordination of Regulatory Enforcement (Regulatory Functions in Scotland and Northern Ireland) Order (SI 2009/669)
- The Co-ordination of Regulatory Enforcement (Procedure for References to LBRO) Order (SI 2009/670)
- The Pensions Increase (Review) Order (SI 2009/692)
- The Health and Safety (Miscellaneous Amendments and Revocations) Regulations (SI 2009/693)
- The Child Trust Funds (Amendment No. 2) Regulations (SI 2009/694)
- The Income Tax (Exemption of Minor Benefits) (Revocation) Regulations (SI 2009/695)
- The Social Security (Contributions) (Re-rating) Consequential Amendment Regulations (SI 2009/696)
- The Tax Credits (Miscellaneous Amendments) Regulations (SI 2009/697)
- The Parliamentary Constituencies (England) (Amendment) Order (SI 2009/698)
- The International Criminal Court (Darfur) Order (SI 2009/699)
- The Consular Fees Order (SI 2009/700)

== 701–800 ==
- The Turks and Caicos Islands Constitution (Interim Amendment) Order (SI 2009/701)
- The Child Abduction and Custody (Parties to Conventions) (Amendment) Order (SI 2009/702)
- The Welsh Ministers (Transfer of Functions) Order (SI 2009/703)
- The International Headquarters and Defence Organisations (Designation and Privileges) (Amendment) Order (SI 2009/704)
- The Visiting Forces and International Headquarters (Application of Law) (Amendment) Order (SI 2009/705)
- The Naval, Military and Air Forces Etc. (Disablement and Death) Service Pensions (Amendment) Order (SI 2009/706)
- The European Communities (Designation) (No. 2) Order (SI 2009/707)
- The National Health Service (Travelling Expenses and Remission of Charges) (Wales) (Amendment) (No.2) Regulations (SI 2009/709)
- The Education (Listed Bodies) (Wales) (Amendment) Order (SI 2009/710)
- The Department for Transport (Fees) Order (SI 2009/711)
- The Financial Assistance For Industry (Increase of Limit) Order (SI 2009/712)
- The Health in Pregnancy Grant (Notices, Revisions and Appeals) Regulations (SI 2009/713)
- The Local Authorities' Plans and Strategies (Disapplication) (England) (Amendment) Order (SI 2009/714)
- The Civil Enforcement of Parking Contraventions (Bedford) Designation Order (SI 2009/715)
- The Chemicals (Hazard Information and Packaging for Supply) Regulations (SI 2009/716)
- The Road Vehicles (Approval) Regulations (SI 2009/717)
- The Road Vehicles (Individual Approval) (Fees) Regulations (SI 2009/718)
- The Motor Vehicles (Type Approval and Approval Marks) (Fees) (Amendment) Regulations (SI 2009/719)
- The Contracting Out (Highway Functions) Order (SI 2009/721)
- The Sexual Offences Act 2003 (Prescribed Police Stations) Regulations (SI 2009/722)
- The Northern Ireland Act 1998 (Ministerial Offices) Order (SI 2009/723)
- The Houses in Multiple Occupation (Management) (England) Regulations (SI 2009/724)
- The Representation of the People (Amendment) Regulations (SI 2009/725)
- The European Parliamentary Elections (Franchise of Relevant Citizens of the Union) (Amendment) Regulations (SI 2009/726)
- The A6 and A5111 Trunk Roads (Raynesway Park Junction Improvement) Order (SI 2009/727)
- The Children and Young Persons Act 2008 (Commencement No. 1) (Wales) Order (SI 2009/728)
- The Title Conditions (Scotland) Act 2003 (Development Management Scheme) Order (SI 2009/729)
- The Enactment of Extra-Statutory Concessions Order (SI 2009/730)
- The Child Support (Miscellaneous and Consequential Amendments) Regulations (SI 2009/736)
- The Pneumoconiosis etc. (Workers' Compensation) (Payment of Claims) (Amendment) Regulations (SI 2009/747)
- The Western Sussex Hospitals National Health Service Trust (Establishment) and the Royal West Sussex National Health Service Trust and the Worthing and Southlands Hospitals National Health Service Trust (Dissolution) Order (SI 2009/750)
- The Health in Pregnancy Grant (Notices, Revisions and Appeals) (No. 2) Regulations (SI 2009/751)
- The Official Statistics Order (SI 2009/753)
- The Employment Code of Practice (Disciplinary and Grievance Procedures) Order (SI 2009/771)
- The South London Healthcare National Health Service Trust (Establishment) and the Bromley Hospitals National Health Service Trust, the Queen Elizabeth Hospital National Health Service Trust and the Queen Mary's Sidcup National Health Service Trust (Dissolution) Order (SI 2009/772)
- The Housing and Regeneration Act 2008 (Commencement No. 1) (Wales) Order (SI 2009/773)
- The Financial Services and Markets Act 2000 (Controllers) (Exemption) Order (SI 2009/774)
- The Welfare Reform Act 2007 (Commencement No. 10, Transitional and Savings Provisions) Order (SI 2009/775)
- The Watford and South of St Albans—Redbourn—Kidney Wood, Luton, Special Road Scheme 1957 (Variation) Scheme (SI 2009/776)
- The Revenue and Customs Appeals Order (SI 2009/777)
- The Local Health Boards (Establishment and Dissolution) (Wales) Order (SI 2009/778)
- The Local Health Boards (Constitution, Membership and Procedures) (Wales) Regulations (SI 2009/779)
- The Wildlife and Countryside Act 1981 (Variation of Schedule 4) (Wales) Order (SI 2009/780)
- The European Parliamentary Elections (Welsh Forms) Order (SI 2009/781)
- The Fire Precautions (Sub-surface Railway Stations) (England) Regulations (SI 2009/782)
- The Mental Capacity (Deprivation of Liberty: Assessments, Standard Authorisations and Disputes about Residence) (Wales) Regulations (SI 2009/783)
- The Education and Skills Act 2008 (Commencement No. 1 and Savings) (Wales) Order (SI 2009/784)
- The Renewables Obligation Order (SI 2009/785)
- The Public Service Vehicles (Operators' Licences) (Amendment) Regulations (SI 2009/786)
- The Public Service Vehicles (Operators' Licences) (Fees) (Amendment) Regulations (SI 2009/787)
- The Motor Vehicles (Driving Licences) (Amendment) Regulations (SI 2009/788)
- The Employment Tribunals Act 1996 (Tribunal Composition) Order (SI 2009/789)
- The Bradford & Bingley plc Compensation Scheme (Amendment) Order (SI 2009/790)
- The Northern Rock plc Compensation Scheme (Amendment) Order (SI 2009/791)
- The Financial Assistance Scheme and Incapacity Benefit (Miscellaneous Amendments) Regulations (SI 2009/792)
- The Eggs and Chicks (Wales) Regulations (SI 2009/793)
- The Occupational Pension Schemes (Levy Ceiling) Order (SI 2009/794)
- The Pension Protection Fund (Pension Compensation Cap) Order (SI 2009/795)
- The Cosmetic Products (Safety) (Amendment) Regulations (SI 2009/796)
- The Guardian's Allowance Up-rating Order (SI 2009/797)
- The Guardian's Allowance Up-rating (Northern Ireland) Order (SI 2009/798)
- The Goods Vehicles (Plating and Testing) (Amendment) Regulations (SI 2009/799)
- The Tax Credits Up-rating Regulations (SI 2009/800)

== 801–900 ==
- The Abolition of the Commission for the New Towns and the Urban Regeneration Agency (Appointed Day and Consequential Amendments) Order (SI 2009/801)
- The Motor Vehicles (Tests) (Amendment) (No. 2) Regulations (SI 2009/802)
- The Housing and Regeneration Act 2008 (Commencement No. 4 and Transitory Provisions) Order (SI 2009/803)
- The Goods Vehicles (Licensing of Operators) (Fees) (Amendment) Regulations (SI 2009/804)
- The Building Societies (Insolvency and Special Administration) Order (SI 2009/805)
- The Building Society Special Administration (Scotland) Rules (SI 2009/806)
- The Financial Services and Markets Act 2000 (Contribution to Costs of Special Resolution Regime) Regulations (SI 2009/807)
- The Pensions Act 2008 (Commencement No. 3 and Consequential Provisions) Order (SI 2009/809)
- The Guardian's Allowance Up-rating Regulations (SI 2009/810)
- The Road Vehicles (Display of Registration Marks) (Amendment) Regulations (SI 2009/811)
- The Armed Forces Act 2006 (Commencement No. 4) Order (SI 2009/812)
- The European Parliamentary Elections (Northern Ireland) (Amendment) Regulations (SI 2009/813)
- The Amendments to Law (Resolution of Dunfermline Building Society) Order (SI 2009/814)
- The Motor Vehicles (Approval) (Amendment) Regulations (SI 2009/815)
- The Immigration and Nationality (Fees) Regulations (SI 2009/816)
- The Diocese of Carlisle (Educational Endowments) Order (SI 2009/817)
- The Road Vehicles (Approval) (Consequential Amendments) Regulations (SI 2009/818)
- The Immigration (Biometric Registration) (Amendment) Regulations (SI 2009/819)
- The Value Added Tax (Amendment) (No. 2) Regulations (SI 2009/820)
- The Education (Admission of Looked After Children) (Wales) Regulations (SI 2009/821)
- The Building (Scotland) Act 2003 (Exemptions for Defence and National Security) Order (SI 2009/822)
- The Education (Admission Appeals Arrangements) (Wales) (Amendment) Regulations (SI 2009/823)
- The Capital Gains Tax (Annual Exempt Amount) Order (SI 2009/824)
- The Education Maintenance Allowances (Wales) (Revocation) Regulations (SI 2009/825)
- The Armed Forces (Naval Chaplains) Regulations (SI 2009/826)
- The Mental Capacity (Deprivation of Liberty: Monitoring and Reporting; and Assessments -Amendment) Regulations (SI 2009/827)
- The Education (Infant Class Sizes) (Wales) (Amendment) Regulations (SI 2009/828)
- The Education (Free School Lunches) (Working Tax Credit) (England) Order (SI 2009/830)
- The Armed Forces (Terms of Service) (Amendment) Regulations (SI 2009/831)
- The Armed Forces (Discharge and Transfer to the Reserve Forces) Regulations (SI 2009/832)
- The Armed Forces (Forfeiture of Service) Regulations (SI 2009/833)
- The Personal Injuries (NHS Charges) Amendment (No. 2) Regulations (SI 2009/834)
- The Armed Forces (Aliens) Regulations (SI 2009/835)
- The Armed Forces (Civilians Subject to Service Discipline) Order (SI 2009/836)
- The Local Government (Structural Changes) (Miscellaneous Amendments and Other Provision) Order (SI 2009/837)
- The Diseases of Animals (Approved Disinfectants) (Fees) (England) Order (SI 2009/839)
- The Charities Act 2006 (Commencement No. 4, Transitional Provisions and Savings) (Amendment) Order (SI 2009/841)
- The Organic Products Regulations (SI 2009/842)
- The Renewable Transport Fuel Obligations (Amendment) Order (SI 2009/843)
- The Motor Cars (Driving Instruction) (Amendment) Regulations (SI 2009/844)
- The Land Registration Fee Order (SI 2009/845)
- The Occupational Pension Schemes (Contracting-out) (Amendment) Regulations (SI 2009/846)
- The Zimbabwe (Financial Sanctions) Regulations (SI 2009/847)
- The European Parliamentary Elections (Amendment) (No.2) Regulations (SI 2009/848)
- The Planning (Consequential Provisions) Act 1990 (Appointed Day No. 2 and Transitional Provision) (England) Order (SI 2009/849)
- The Cornwall (Electoral Arrangements and Consequential Amendments) Order (SI 2009/850)
- The Town and Country Planning (Fees for Applications and Deemed Applications) (Amendment) (Wales) Regulations (SI 2009/851)
- The Financial Markets and Insolvency Regulations (SI 2009/853)
- The Goods Vehicles (Authorisation of International Journeys) (Fees) (Amendment) Regulations (SI 2009/855)
- The International Carriage of Dangerous Goods by Road (Fees) (Amendment) Regulations (SI 2009/856)
- The Family Proceedings (Amendment) (No.2) Rules (SI 2009/857)
- The Family Proceedings Courts (Miscellaneous Amendments) Rules (SI 2009/858)
- The Data Retention (EC Directive) Regulations (SI 2009/859)
- The Criminal Justice and Immigration Act 2008 (Commencement No. 7) Order (SI 2009/860)
- The International Transport of Goods under Cover of TIR Carnets (Fees) (Amendment) Regulations (SI 2009/861)
- The Education (Student Support) Regulations 2008 (Amendment) Regulations (SI 2009/862)
- The Motor Vehicles (Approval) (Fees) (Amendment) Regulations (SI 2009/863)
- The Legislative Reform (Insolvency) (Advertising Requirements) Order (SI 2009/864)
- The Motor Cycles Etc. (Single Vehicle Approval) (Fees) (Amendment) Regulations (SI 2009/865)
- The Passenger and Goods Vehicles (Recording Equipment) (Approval of Fitters and Workshops) (Fees) (Amendment) Regulations (SI 2009/866)
- The Access to Justice Act 1999 (Destination of Appeals) (Family Proceedings) Order (SI 2009/871)
- Babbacombe Cliff Railway Order 2009 (SI 2009/872)
- The Distress for Rent (Amendment) Rules (SI 2009/873)
- The Products of Animal Origin (Third Country Imports) (England) (Amendment) Regulations (SI 2009/875)
- The Public Service Vehicles Accessibility (Amendment)(No.2) Regulations (SI 2009/876)
- The Public Service Vehicles (Conditions of Fitness, Equipment, Use and Certification) (Amendment) (No. 2) Regulations (SI 2009/877)
- The Public Service Vehicles (Registration of Local Services) (Amendment) (England and Wales) Regulations (SI 2009/878)
- The Road Transport (International Passenger Services) (Amendment) Regulations (SI 2009/879)
- The Road Vehicles (Registration and Licensing) (Amendment) Regulations (SI 2009/880)
- The Vehicle Excise (Design Weight Certificate) (Amendment) Regulations (SI 2009/881)
- The Inspectors of Education, Children's Services and Skills Order (SI 2009/882)
- The Health Service Commissioner for England (Authorities for the Ashworth, Broadmoor and Rampton Hospitals) (Revocation) Order (SI 2009/883)
- The Criminal Damage (Compensation) (Amendment) (Northern Ireland) Order (SI 2009/884)
- The Northern Ireland Act 1998 (Modification) Order (SI 2009/885)
- The Iran (United Nations Sanctions) Order (SI 2009/886)
- The European Union Military Staff (Immunities and Privileges) Order (SI 2009/887)
- The Judicial Proceedings in Specified Overseas Territories (Restrictive Measures) Order (SI 2009/888)
- The Merthyr Tydfil and Powys (Areas) Order (SI 2009/889)
- The Waste Batteries and Accumulators Regulations (SI 2009/890)
- The Purity Criteria for Colours, Sweeteners and Miscellaneous Food Additives (England) Regulations (SI 2009/891)
- The Accession (Immigration and Worker Registration) (Amendment) Regulations (SI 2009/892)

== 901–1000 ==
- The Police and Justice Act 2006 (Commencement No. 1) (England) Order (SI 2009/936)
- The Crime and Disorder (Overview and Scrutiny) Regulations (SI 2009/942)
- The Local Government and Public Involvement in Health Act 2007 (Commencement No. 1) (England) Order (SI 2009/959)
- The Proceeds of Crime Act 2002 (References to Financial Investigators) Order (SI 2009/975)
- The Hendon Urban Motorway Special Roads Scheme 1961 (Variation) Order (SI 2009/977)
- The Criminal Procedure and Investigations Act 1996 (Application to the Armed Forces) Order (SI 2009/988)
- The Criminal Procedure and Investigations Act 1996 (Code of Practice) (Armed Forces) Order (SI 2009/989)
- The Criminal Justice and Public Order Act 1994 (Application to the Armed Forces) Order (SI 2009/990)
- The Armed Forces (Conditional Release from Custody) Order (SI 2009/991)
- The Court Martial Appeal Court (Bail) Order (SI 2009/992)
- The Armed Forces (Proceedings) (Costs) Regulations (SI 2009/993)
- The Criminal Justice Act 1988 (Application to Service Courts) (Evidence) (Revocation) Order (SI 2009/994)
- The Environmental Damage (Prevention and Remediation) (Wales) Regulations (SI 2009/995)

== 1001–1100 ==
- The First-tier Tribunal and Upper Tribunal (Chambers) (Amendment No. 2) Order (SI 2009/1021)
- The Finance Act 1998, Schedule 2 (Assessments in Respect of Drawback) (Appointed Day) Order (SI 2009/1022)
- The Excise Goods (Drawback) (Amendment) Regulations (SI 2009/1023)
- The Town and Country Planning (General Development Procedure) (Amendment) (Wales) Order (SI 2009/1024)
- The Local Government Pension Scheme (Amendment) Regulations (SI 2009/1025)
- The Planning (Listed Buildings and Conservation Areas) (Amendment) (Wales) Regulations (SI 2009/1026)
- The Education and Inspections Act 2006 (Commencement No. 3) (Wales) Order (SI 2009/1027)
- The Criminal Justice and Immigration Act 2008 (Commencement No. 8) Order (SI 2009/1028)
- The Substantial Donor Transactions (Variation of Threshold Limits) Regulations (SI 2009/1029)
- The Value Added Tax (Consideration for Fuel Provided for Private Use) Order (SI 2009/1030)
- The Value Added Tax (Increase of Registration Limits) Order (SI 2009/1031)
- The Immigration (Passenger Transit Visa) (Amendment) (No. 2) Order (SI 2009/1032)
- The Crime and Disorder Act 1998 (Responsible Authorities) Order (SI 2009/1033)
- The Textile Products (Indications of Fibre Content) (Amendment) (No. 2) Regulations (SI 2009/1034)
- The National Health Service Trusts (Originating Capital) (Wales) Order (SI 2009/1035)
- The Cat and Dog Fur (Control of Import, Export and Placing on the Market) (Amendment) Regulations (SI 2009/1056)
- The Private Security Industry Act 2001 (Commencement No.2) (Northern Ireland) Order (SI 2009/1058)
- The Armed Forces Act 2006 (Transitional Provisions etc.) Order (SI 2009/1059)
- The Charitable Institutions (Fund-Raising) (Amendment) Regulations (SI 2009/1060)
- The European Parliamentary Elections (Returning Officers' Charges) (Great Britain and Gibraltar) Order (SI 2009/1069)
- The European Parliamentary Elections (Local Returning Officers' Charges) (England, Wales and Gibraltar) Order (SI 2009/1077)
- The Company and Business Names (Miscellaneous Provisions) Regulations (SI 2009/1085)
- The Housing Renewal Grants (Amendment) (Wales) Regulations (SI 2009/1087)
- The Products of Animal Origin (Third Country Imports) (Wales) (Amendment) (No. 2) Regulations (SI 2009/1088)
- The Armed Forces (Terms of Service) (Amendment) (No. 2) Regulations (SI 2009/1089)
- The Armed Forces (Forfeiture of Service) (No. 2) Regulations (SI 2009/1090)
- The Armed Forces (Discharge and Transfer to the Reserve Forces) (No. 2) Regulations (SI 2009/1091)
- The Purity Criteria for Colours, Sweeteners and Miscellaneous Food Additives (Wales) Regulations (SI 2009/1092)
- The Armed Forces (Service of Process in Maintenance Proceedings) Regulations (SI 2009/1093)
- The Armed Forces (Prescribed Air Navigation Order Offences) Order (SI 2009/1094)
- The Traffic Management Act 2004 (Commencement No. 3) (Wales) Order (SI 2009/1095)
- The Service Custody and Service of Relevant Sentences Rules (SI 2009/1096)
- The Armed Forces (Custody Without Charge) Regulations (SI 2009/1097)
- The Armed Forces (Custody Proceedings) Rules (SI 2009/1098)
- The School Admissions (Admission Arrangements) (England) (Amendment) Regulations (SI 2009/1099)
- The Greater Manchester (Light Rapid Transit System) (Media City Extension) Order (SI 2009/1100)

== 1101–1200 ==
- The Armed Forces (Protection of Children of Service Families) Regulations (SI 2009/1107)
- The Armed Forces (Evidence of Illegal Absence and Transfer to Service Custody) Regulations (SI 2009/1108)
- The Armed Forces (Forfeitures and Deductions) Regulations (SI 2009/1109)
- The Armed Forces (Warrants of Arrest for Service Offences) Rules (SI 2009/1110)
- The Reserve Forces (Evidence in Proceedings before Civil Courts) Regulations (SI 2009/1111)
- The Armed Forces (Evidence in Proceedings before Civilian Courts) Regulations (SI 2009/1112)
- The Upper Tribunal (Lands Chamber) Fees Order (SI 2009/1114)
- The Stamp Duty and Stamp Duty Reserve Tax (Investment Exchanges and Clearing Houses) Regulations (No. 4) (SI 2009/1115)
- The Local Authorities' Traffic Orders (Procedure) (England and Wales) (Amendment) (England) Regulations (SI 2009/1116)
- The Immigration (European Economic Area) (Amendment) Regulations (SI 2009/1117)
- The European Parliamentary Election Petition (Amendment) Rules (SI 2009/1118)
- The Animal By-Products (Amendment) Regulations (SI 2009/1119)
- The European Parliamentary Elections (Local Returning Officers' Charges) (Scotland) Order (SI 2009/1120)
- The Railways Infrastructure (Access and Management) (Amendment) Regulations (SI 2009/1122)
- The European Parliamentary Elections (Returning Officer's Charges) (Northern Ireland) Order (SI 2009/1143)
- The Medicines for Human Use (Miscellaneous Amendments) Regulations (SI 2009/1164)
- The Medicines for Human Use (Prescribing)(Miscellaneous Amendments) Order (SI 2009/1165)
- The National Health Service (Charges) (Amendments Relating to Pandemic Influenza) Regulations (SI 2009/1166)
- The Armed Forces Act 2006 (Commencement No. 5) Order (SI 2009/1167)
- The Armed Forces (Review of Court Martial Sentence) Order (SI 2009/1168)
- The Armed Forces (Review of Court Martial Sentence) (Supplementary Provision) Regulations (SI 2009/1169)
- The North Level District Internal Drainage District and the South Holland Internal Drainage District (Alteration of Boundaries) Order (SI 2009/1170)
- The Registered Pension Schemes (Authorised Payments) Regulations (SI 2009/1171)
- The Taxation of Pension Schemes (Transitional Provisions) (Amendment) Order (SI 2009/1172)
- The Export Control (Uzbekistan) (Amendment) Order (SI 2009/1174)
- The National Health Service (Charges) (Amendments Relating to Pandemic Influenza) (Wales) Regulations (SI 2009/1175)
- The Merchant Shipping and Fishing Vessels (Port Waste Reception Facilities) (Amendment) Regulations (SI 2009/1176)
- The Value Added Tax (Refund of Tax to Charter Trustees and Conservators) Order (SI 2009/1177)
- The Street Works (Charges for Unreasonably Prolonged Occupation of the Highway) (England) (Amendment) Regulations (SI 2009/1178)
- The Fire and Rescue Services (Appointment of Inspector) (Wales) Order (SI 2009/1179)
- The European Communities (Definition of Treaties) (United Nations Convention on the Rights of Persons with Disabilities) Order (SI 2009/1181)
- The Health Care and Associated Professions (Miscellaneous Amendments and Practitioner Psychologists) Order (SI 2009/1182)

== 1201–1300 ==
- The Companies Act 2006 (Amendment of Schedule 2) (No. 2) Order (SI 2009/1208)
- The Armed Forces (Service Civilian Court) Rules (SI 2009/1209)
- The Merchant Shipping (Implementation of Ship-Source Pollution Directive) Regulations (SI 2009/1210)
- The Armed Forces (Summary Appeal Court) Rules (SI 2009/1211)
- The Armed Forces (Financial Penalty Enforcement Orders) Regulations (SI 2009/1212)
- The Armed Forces (Unfitness to Stand Trial and Insanity) Regulations (SI 2009/1213)
- The Armed Forces (Service Supervision and Punishment Orders) Regulations (SI 2009/1214)
- The Armed Forces (Minor Punishments and Limitation on Power to Reduce in Rank) Regulations (SI 2009/1215)
- The Armed Forces (Summary Hearing and Activation of Suspended Sentences of Service Detention) Rules (SI 2009/1216)
- The Veterinary Surgery (Wing and Web Tagging) Order (SI 2009/1217)
- The Designation of Schools Having a Religious Character (Independent Schools) (Wales) Order (SI 2009/1218)
- The Building and Approved Inspectors (Amendment) Regulations (SI 2009/1219)
- The Functions in relation to External Qualifications (Wales) Order (SI 2009/1220)
- The Contaminants in Food (England) Regulations (SI 2009/1223)
- The Firefighters' Pension Scheme (Wales) (Amendment) Order (SI 2009/1225)
- The Firefighters' Pension (Wales) Scheme (Amendment) Order (SI 2009/1226)
- The Financial Assistance For Industry (Increase of Limit) (No. 2) Order (SI 2009/1227)
- The Financial Assistance For Industry (Increase of Limit) (No. 3) Order (SI 2009/1228)
- The Immigration (Passenger Transit Visa) (Amendment) (No. 3) Order (SI 2009/1229)
- The Berwick Upon Tweed Harbour Revision (Constitution) Order (SI 2009/1231)
- The Immigration (Passenger Transit Visa) (Amendment) (No. 4) Order (SI 2009/1233)
- The Cambridge City Fringes Joint Committee Order (SI 2009/1254)
- The Standards Committee (Further Provisions) (England) Regulations (SI 2009/1255)
- The Counter-Terrorism Act 2008 (Commencement No. 3) Order (SI 2009/1256)
- The Carbon Accounting Regulations (SI 2009/1257)
- The Climate Change Act 2008 (2020 Target, Credit Limit and Definitions) Order (SI 2009/1258)
- The Carbon Budgets Order (SI 2009/1259)
- The Housing (Replacement of Terminated Tenancies) (Successor Landlords) (Wales) Order (SI 2009/1260)
- The Housing and Regeneration Act 2008 (Commencement No.5) Order (SI 2009/1261)
- The Housing (Replacement of Terminated Tenancies) (Successor Landlords) (England) Order (SI 2009/1262)
- The National Savings (Unclaimed Moneys) Regulations (SI 2009/1263)
- The Surface Waters (Fishlife) (Classification) (Amendment) Regulations (SI 2009/1264)
- The Surface Waters (Shellfish) (Classification) (Amendment) Regulations (SI 2009/1266)
- The Traffic Management Permit Scheme (Wales) Regulations (SI 2009/1267)
- The Street Works (Charges for Unreasonably Prolonged Occupation of the Highway) (Wales) Regulations (SI 2009/1268)
- The Energy Act 2004 (Commencement No. 9) Order (SI 2009/1269)
- The Energy Act 2008 (Commencement No. 3) Order (SI 2009/1270)
- The Gambling Act 2005 (Limits on Prize Gaming) Regulations (SI 2009/1272)
- The Seeds (National Lists of Varieties) (Amendment) Regulations (SI 2009/1273)
- The Seed (Conservation Varieties Amendments) (England) Regulations (SI 2009/1274)
- The Banking Act 2009 (Commencement No. 2) Order (SI 2009/1296)
- The Products of Animal Origin (Disease Control) (England) (Amendment) Regulations (SI 2009/1297)
- The National Health Service Pension Scheme (Amendment) Regulations (SI 2009/1298)
- The Swine Vesicular Disease Regulations (SI 2009/1299)
- The Nottingham Express Transit System Order (SI 2009/1300)

== 1301–1400 ==
- The Education (Areas to which Pupils and Students Belong) (Amendment) (England) Regulations (SI 2009/1301)
- The Infrastructure Planning (National Policy Statement Consultation) Regulations (SI 2009/1302)
- The Planning Act 2008 (Commencement No. 1) (England) Order (SI 2009/1303)
- The Town and Country Planning (General Development Procedure) (Amendment) (No. 2) (England) Order (SI 2009/1304)
- The Export Control (Amendment) Order (SI 2009/1305)
- The National Health Service Trusts (Dissolution) (Wales) Order (SI 2009/1306)
- The Transfer of Tribunal Functions (Lands Tribunal and Miscellaneous Amendments) Order (SI 2009/1307)
- The Fisheries (Miscellaneous Amendments) Regulations (SI 2009/1309)
- The Health and Social Care Act 2008 (Commencement No. 10) Order (SI 2009/1310)
- The Pension Schemes (Reduction in Pension Rates) (Amendment) Regulations (SI 2009/1311)
- The Crossrail (Planning Appeals) (Written Representations Procedure) (England) (Amendment) Regulations (SI 2009/1312)
- The Child Maintenance and Other Payments Act 2008 (Commencement No. 5) Order (SI 2009/1314)
- The Education (Areas to which Pupils and Students Belong) (Amendment) (Wales) Regulations (SI 2009/1338)
- The Electricity (Competitive Tenders for Offshore Transmission Licences) Regulations (SI 2009/1340)
- The Financial Services and Markets Act 2000 (Regulated Activities) (Amendment) Order (SI 2009/1342)
- The Research and Development (Qualifying Bodies) (Tax) Order (SI 2009/1343)
- The Stamp Duty and Stamp Duty Reserve Tax (Investment Exchanges and Clearing Houses) Regulations (No. 5) (SI 2009/1344)
- The Health Professions Council (Constitution) Order (SI 2009/1345)
- The Cosmetic Products (Safety) (Amendment No.2) Regulations (SI 2009/1346)
- The Magnetic Toys (Safety) (Revocation) Regulations (SI 2009/1347)
- The Carriage of Dangerous Goods and Use of Transportable Pressure Equipment Regulations (SI 2009/1348)
- The Gas and Electricity (Dispute Resolution) Regulations (SI 2009/1349)
- The Education (Supply of Information) (Wales) Regulations (SI 2009/1350)
- The General Teaching Council for Wales (Additional Functions) (Amendment) Order (SI 2009/1351)
- The General Teaching Council for Wales (Constitution) (Amendment) Regulations (SI 2009/1352)
- The General Teaching Council for Wales (Functions) (Amendment) Regulations (SI 2009/1353)
- The General Teaching Council for Wales (Disciplinary Functions) (Amendment) Regulations (SI 2009/1354)
- The Health Professions Council (Practice Committees and Miscellaneous Amendments) Rules Order of Council (SI 2009/1355)
- The Seed (Conservation Varieties Amendments) (Wales) Regulations (SI 2009/1356)
- The Health Care and Associated Professions (Miscellaneous Amendments and Practitioner Psychologists) Order 2009 (Commencement No. 1 and Transitional Provisions) Order of Council (SI 2009/1357)
- The Dentists Act 1984 (Medical Authorities) Order (SI 2009/1358)
- The Value Added Tax (Reduced Rate) (Children's Car Seats) Order (SI 2009/1359)
- The Audit Commission for Local Authorities and the National Health Service in England (Specified Organisations) (England) Order (SI 2009/1360)
- The Marketing of Fresh Horticultural Produce Regulations (SI 2009/1361)
- The FCO Services Trading Fund (Variation) Order (SI 2009/1362)
- The Legal Services Act 2007 (Commencement No. 5, Transitory and Transitional Provisions) Order (SI 2009/1365)
- The Asian Development Bank (Ninth Replenishment of the Asian Development Fund) Order (SI 2009/1368)
- The Freedom of Information (Time for Compliance with Request) Regulations (SI 2009/1369)
- The A5117 Trunk Road (Parkgate Road Roundabout) (De-Trunking) Order (SI 2009/1370)
- The Merchant Shipping (Light Dues) (Amendment) Regulations (SI 2009/1371)
- The Swine Vesicular Disease (Wales) Regulations (SI 2009/1372)
- The Products of Animal Origin (Disease Control) (Wales) (Amendment) Regulations (SI 2009/1373)
- The Offshore Installations (Safety Zones) Order (SI 2009/1374)
- The Legislative Reform (Local Government) (Animal Health Functions) Order (SI 2009/1375)
- The Plant Health (Wales) (Amendment) Order (SI 2009/1376)
- The National Insurance Contribution Credits (Transfer of Functions) Order (SI 2009/1377)
- The Companies Act 2006 (Extension of Takeover Panel Provisions) (Isle of Man) Order (SI 2009/1378)
- The Cayman Islands Constitution Order (SI 2009/1379)
- The Scotland Act 1998 (Modification of Schedule 4) Order (SI 2009/1380)
- The European Communities (Designation) (No. 3) Order (SI 2009/1381)
- The National Health Service Trusts (Originating Capital) (Wales) (Amendment) Order (SI 2009/1382)
- The Public Health Wales National Health Service Trust (Membership and Procedure) Regulations (SI 2009/1385)
- The Contaminants in Food (Wales) Regulations (SI 2009/1386)
- The Education (Special Educational Needs Co-ordinators) (England) (Amendment) Regulations (SI 2009/1387)
- The Asylum Support (Amendment) (No. 2) Regulations (SI 2009/1388)
- The Financial Services and Markets Act 2000 (Regulated Activities) (Amendment) (No. 2) Order (SI 2009/1389)
- The Financial Services and Markets Act 2000 (Control of Business Transfers) (Requirements on Applicants) (Amendment) Regulations (SI 2009/1390)
- The Building Societies (Accounts and Related Provisions) (Amendment) Regulations (SI 2009/1391)
- The Landsbanki Freezing (Revocation) Order (SI 2009/1392)
- The Land Registration (Proper Office) Order (SI 2009/1393)
- The Safety of Sports Grounds (Designation) (No.2) Order (SI 2009/1394)
- The Football Spectators (Seating) Order (SI 2009/1395)
- The Social Security (Industrial Injuries) (Prescribed Diseases) Amendment Regulations (SI 2009/1396)
- The Human Fertilisation and Embryology (Procedure for Revocation, Variation or Refusal of Licences) Regulations (SI 2009/1397)

== 1401–1500 ==
- The M3 and M25 (Thorpe Interchange) (Speed Limit) Regulations (SI 2009/1421)
- The Stamp Duty and Stamp Duty Reserve Tax (Investment Exchanges and Clearing Houses) Regulations (No. 6) (SI 2009/1462)
- The Real Estate Investment Trusts (Amendment of Schedule 16 to the Finance Act 2006) Regulations (SI 2009/1482)
- The European Parliament (Pay and Pensions) Regulations (SI 2009/1485)
- The Fixed Penalty (Amendment) (No. 3) Order (SI 2009/1487)
- The Social Security (Equalisation of State Pension Age) Regulations (SI 2009/1488)
- The Social Fund Winter Fuel Payment (Temporary Increase) Regulations (SI 2009/1489)
- The Social Security (Miscellaneous Amendments) (No. 2) Regulations (SI 2009/1490)
- The National Health Service (Pharmaceutical Services) (Amendment) (Wales) Regulation (SI 2009/1491)
- The Air Navigation (Dangerous Goods) (Amendment) Regulations (SI 2009/1492)
- The Counter-Terrorism Act 2008 (Commencement No. 4) Order (SI 2009/1493)
- The Social Security (Recovery of Benefits) (Lump Sum Payments) (Amendment) Regulations (SI 2009/1494)
- The Burma/Myanmar (Financial Restrictions) Regulations (SI 2009/1495)
- The Magistrates' Courts Fees (Amendment) Order (SI 2009/1496)
- The Non-Contentious Probate Fees (Amendment) Order (SI 2009/1497)
- The Civil Proceedings Fees (Amendment) Order (SI 2009/1498)
- The Family Proceedings Fees (Amendment) Order (SI 2009/1499)
- The Education (Admission Appeals Arrangements) (Wales) (Amendment No. 2) Regulations (SI 2009/1500)

== 1501–1600 ==
- The Safety of Sports Grounds (Designation) (No.3) Order (SI 2009/1501)
- The Categories of Gaming Machine (Amendment) Regulations (SI 2009/1502)
- The Safeguarding Vulnerable Groups Act 2006 (Commencement No. 4) Order (SI 2009/1503)
- The Packaging (Essential Requirements) (Amendment) Regulations (SI 2009/1504)
- The Fishguard to Bangor Trunk Road (A487) (Porthmadog, Minffordd and Tremadog Bypass and De-trunking) Order (SI 2009/1505)
- The Financial Assistance for Environmental Purposes (England and Wales) Order (SI 2009/1506)
- The Childcare (Fees) (Amendment) Regulations (SI 2009/1507)
- The Childcare (Inspections) (Amendment) Regulations (SI 2009/1508)
- The Electoral Administration Act 2006 (Commencement No.8 and Transitional Provision) Order (SI 2009/1509)
- The George Eliot Hospital National Health Service Trust (Establishment) Amendment Order (SI 2009/1510)
- The Local Health Boards (Directed Functions) (Wales) Regulations (SI 2009/1511)
- The National Health Service (Charges to Overseas Visitors) (Amendment) (Wales) Regulations (SI 2009/1512)
- The Education and Skills Act 2008 (Commencement No. 3) Order (SI 2009/1513)
- The Enfield College (Dissolution) Order (SI 2009/1514)
- The Merton College, Morden (Dissolution) Order (SI 2009/1515)
- The Pollution Prevention and Control (Designation of Directives) (England and Wales) Order (SI 2009/1517)
- The Designated Teacher (Looked After Pupils etc.)(England) Regulations (SI 2009/1538)
- The Social Security (Incapacity Benefit Work-focused Interviews) (Amendment) Regulations (SI 2009/1541)
- The Pensions Act 2004 (Commencement No.13) Order (SI 2009/1542)
- The Matthew Boulton College of Further and Higher Education, Birmingham (Dissolution) Order (SI 2009/1543)
- The Income Tax (Qualifying Child Care) Regulations (SI 2009/1544)
- The Childcare (General Childcare Register) (Amendment) Regulations (SI 2009/1545)
- The Childcare (Disqualification) Regulations (SI 2009/1547)
- The Safeguarding Vulnerable Groups Act 2006 (Miscellaneous Provisions) Regulations (SI 2009/1548)
- The Early Years Foundation Stage (Welfare Requirements) (Amendment) Regulations (SI 2009/1549)
- The Individual Savings Account (Amendment) Regulations (SI 2009/1550)
- The Marketing of Fresh Horticultural Produce (Wales) Regulations (SI 2009/1551)
- The Pension Protection Fund (Entry Rules) (Amendment) Regulations (SI 2009/1552)
- The Debt Relief Orders (Designation of Competent Authorities) (Amendment) Regulations (SI 2009/1553)
- The Childcare (Provision of Information About Young Children) (England) Regulations (SI 2009/1554)
- The Education (Student Support) Regulations (SI 2009/1555)
- The School Organisation and Governance (Amendment) (England) Regulations (SI 2009/1556)
- The Meat (Official Controls Charges) (Wales) Regulations (SI 2009/1557)
- The National Health Service Trusts (Transfer of Staff, Property, Rights and Liabilities) (Wales) Order (SI 2009/1558)
- The Local Health Boards (Transfer of Staff, Property, Rights and Liabilities) (Wales) Order (SI 2009/1559)
- The Education (Assisted Places) (Incidental Expenses) (Amendment) (England) Regulations (SI 2009/1560)
- The Education (Assisted Places) (Amendment) (England) Regulations (SI 2009/1561)
- The Flexible New Deal (Miscellaneous Provisions) Order (SI 2009/1562)
- The Education (Individual Pupil Information) (Prescribed Persons) (England) Regulations (SI 2009/1563)
- The Education (School Inspection) (England) (Amendment) Regulations (SI 2009/1564)
- The Pensions Act 2004 (Code of Practice) (Material Detriment Test) Appointed Day Order (SI 2009/1565)
- The Pensions Act 2008 (Commencement No. 4) Order (SI 2009/1566)
- The Working Time (Amendment) Regulations (SI 2009/1567)
- The M42 (Junctions 3A to 7) (Actively Managed Hard Shoulder and Variable Speed Limits) (Amendment) Regulations (SI 2009/1568)
- The M40 Motorway (M40 Junction 16 to M42 Junction 3A) (Northbound) (Variable Speed Limits) Regulations (SI 2009/1569)
- The M42 Motorway (Junctions 7 to 9) (Variable Speed Limits) Regulations (SI 2009/1570)
- The M6 Motorway (Junctions 4 to 5) (Actively Managed Hard Shoulder and Variable Speed Limits) Regulations (SI 2009/1571)
- The Olympic Route Network Designation Order (SI 2009/1573)
- The Meat (Official Controls Charges) (England) Regulations (SI 2009/1574)
- The Social Security (Students and Miscellaneous Amendments) Regulations (SI 2009/1575)
- The Education (Student Support) (European Institutions) (Amendment) Regulations (SI 2009/1576)
- The Mid Yorkshire Hospitals National Health Service Trust (Establishment) Amendment Order (SI 2009/1577)
- The Chilterns Area of Outstanding Natural Beauty (Establishment of Conservation Board) (Amendment) Order (SI 2009/1578)
- The Cotswolds Area of Outstanding Natural Beauty (Establishment of Conservation Board) (Amendment) Order (SI 2009/1579)
- The Swine Vesicular Disease (Wales) (Amendment) Regulations (SI 2009/1580)
- The Companies Act 2006 (Accounts, Reports and Audit) Regulations (SI 2009/1581)
- The Human Fertilisation and Embryology (Statutory Storage Period for Embryos and Gametes) Regulations (SI 2009/1582)
- The Pensions Act 2004 (Commencement No.6, Transitional Provisions and Savings) (Amendment) Order (SI 2009/1583)
- The Food Irradiation (England) Regulations (SI 2009/1584)
- The Education (National Curriculum) (Key Stages 2 and 3 Assessment Arrangements) (England) (Amendment) Order (SI 2009/1585)
- The Education (Outturn Statements) (England) Regulations (SI 2009/1586)
- The Legal Services Act 2007 (Registered European Lawyers) Order (SI 2009/1587)
- The Probate Services (Approved Bodies) Order (SI 2009/1588)
- The Registered Foreign Lawyers Order (SI 2009/1589)
- The First-tier Tribunal and Upper Tribunal (Chambers) (Amendment No. 3) Order (SI 2009/1590)
- The Mobile Roaming (European Communities) (Amendment) Regulations (SI 2009/1591)
- The Qualifications for Appointment of Members to the First-tier Tribunal and Upper Tribunal (Amendment) Order (SI 2009/1592)
- The Terrorism Act 2000 (Code of Practice for Examining Officers) (Revision) Order (SI 2009/1593)
- The Control of Major Accident Hazards (Amendment) Regulations (SI 2009/1595)
- The Education (School and Local Education Authority Performance Targets) (England) (Amendment) Regulations (SI 2009/1596)
- The Non-Domestic Rating (Deferred Payments) (England) Regulations (SI 2009/1597)
- The Natural Mineral Water, Spring Water and Bottled Drinking Water (England) (Amendment) Regulations (SI 2009/1598)
- The National Health Service (Travel Expenses and Remission of Charges) Amendment Regulations (SI 2009/1599)
- The Electricity (Exemption from the Requirement for a Generation Licence) (Rhyl Flats) (England and Wales) Order (SI 2009/1600)

== 1601–1700 ==
- The Stamp Duty and Stamp Duty Reserve Tax (Investment Exchanges and Clearing Houses) Regulations (No. 7) (SI 2009/1601)
- The Adult Skills (Specified Qualifications) Regulations (SI 2009/1602)
- The Supreme Court Rules (SI 2009/1603)
- The Constitutional Reform Act 2005 (Commencement No. 11) Order (SI 2009/1604)
- The Civil Aviation (Customs and Excise Airports) Order (SI 2009/1605)
- The Education and Skills Act 2008 (Commencement No. 4, Commencement No. 3 (Amendment), Transitory and Saving Provisions) Order (SI 2009/1606)
- The Education (Independent Educational Provision in England) (Inspection Fees) Regulations (SI 2009/1607)
- The Welfare Reform Act 2007 (Commencement No. 11) Order (SI 2009/1608)
- The Ministry of Defence Police (Committee) Regulations (SI 2009/1609)
- The Environmental Noise (England) (Amendment) Regulations (SI 2009/1610)
- The Horse Passports Regulations (SI 2009/1611)
- The M57 Motorway Junction 7 (Switch Island) (Speed Limits) Regulations (SI 2009/1631)
- The Companies (Shareholders' Rights) Regulations (SI 2009/1632)
- The Education (Independent Educational Provision in England) (Unsuitable Persons) Regulations (SI 2009/1633)
- The Education (Free School Lunches) (Working Tax Credit) (Wales) Order (SI 2009/1673)
- The Lyme Bay Designated Area (Fishing Restrictions) (Amendment) Order (SI 2009/1675)
- The Social Security (Deemed Income from Capital) Regulations (SI 2009/1676)
- The Data Protection (Notification and Notification Fees) (Amendment) Regulations (SI 2009/1677)
- The Criminal Justice and Immigration Act 2008 (Commencement No. 9) Order (SI 2009/1678)
- The Police and Justice Act 2006 (Commencement No. 11) Order (SI 2009/1679)
- The Scottish Parliamentary Pensions Act 2009 (Consequential Modifications) Order (SI 2009/1682)

== 1701–1800 ==
- Reconstitution of the Lindsey Marsh Drainage Board Order 2009 (SI 2009/1723)
- Legislative Reform (Supervision of Alcohol Sales in Church and Village Halls &c.) Order 2009 (SI 2009/1724)
- Wildlife and Countryside (Registration, Ringing and Marking of Certain Captive Birds) (Wales) (Amendment) Regulations 2009 (SI 2009/1733)
- Air Navigation (Single European Sky) (Penalties) Order 2009 (SI 2009/1735)
- Service Departments Registers (Amendment) Order 2009 (SI 2009/1736)
- Falkland Islands Courts (Overseas Jurisdiction) (Amendment) Order 2009 (SI 2009/1737)
- International Criminal Court Act 2001 (Overseas Territories) Order 2009 (SI 2009/1738)
- Criminal Jurisdiction (Application to Offshore Renewable Energy Installations etc.) Order 2009 (SI 2009/1739)
- Inspectors of Education, Children's Services and Skills (No. 2) Order 2009 (SI 2009/1740)
- Commonwealth Countries and Ireland (Immunities and Privileges) (Amendment) Order 2009 (SI 2009/1741)
- Air Navigation (Amendment) Order 2009 (SI 2009/1742)
- Civil Jurisdiction (Application to Offshore Renewable Energy Installations etc.) Order 2009 (SI 2009/1743)
- Public Records (Designation of Bodies) Order 2009 (SI 2009/1744)
- Consular Fees (Amendment) Order 2009 (SI 2009/1745)
- North Korea (United Nations Measures) (Overseas Territories) (Amendment) Order 2009 (SI 2009/1746)
- Terrorism (United Nations Measures) Order 2009 (SI 2009/1747)
- European Organization for Astronomical Research in the Southern Hemisphere (Immunities and Privileges) Order 2009 (SI 2009/1748)
- North Korea (United Nations Sanctions) Order 2009 (SI 2009/1749)
- Health and Safety at Work etc. Act 1974 (Application outside Great Britain) (Variation) Order 2009 (SI 2009/1750)
- St Helena, Ascension and Tristan da Cunha Constitution Order 2009 (SI 2009/1751)
- Armed Forces, Army, Air Force and Naval Discipline Acts (Continuation) Order 2009 (SI 2009/1752)
- Parliamentary Commissioner Order 2009 (SI 2009/1754)
- Turks and Caicos Islands Constitution (Interim Amendment) (Amendment) Order 2009 (SI 2009/1755)
- European Communities (Definition of Treaties) (Maritime Labour Convention) Order 2009 (SI 2009/1757)
- National Assembly for Wales (Legislative Competence) (Agriculture and Rural Development) Order 2009 (SI 2009/1758)
- European Communities (Definition of Treaties) (CARIFORUM Economic Partnership Agreement) Order 2009 (SI 2009/1759)
- Crime (International Co-operation) Act 2003 (Designation of Participating Countries) (England, Wales and Northern Ireland) (No. 2) Order 2009 (SI 2009/1764)
- Local Authority Social Services and National Health Service Complaints (England) (Amendment) Regulations 2009 (SI 2009/1768)
- Common Agricultural Policy Single Payment and Support Schemes (Horticulture) Regulations 2009 (SI 2009/1771)
- Legislative Reform (Minor Variations to Premises Licences and Club Premises Certificates) Order 2009 (SI 2009/1772)
- Control of Trade in Endangered Species (Enforcement) (Amendment) Regulations 2009 (SI 2009/1773)
- Food Irradiation (Wales) Regulations 2009 (SI 2009/1795)
- Local Government (Wales) Measure 2009 (Commencement No 1) Order 2009 (SI 2009/1796)
- Safeguarding Vulnerable Groups Act 2006 (Miscellaneous Provisions) Order 2009 (SI 2009/1797)
- Police Act 1997 (Criminal Records) (Disclosure) (Amendment) Regulations (Northern Ireland) 2009 (SI 2009/1798)
- Environmental Permitting (England and Wales) (Amendment) Regulations 2009 (SI 2009/1799)
- Dunfermline Building Society Compensation Scheme, Resolution Fund and Third Party Compensation Order 2009 (SI 2009/1800)

== 1801–1900 ==
- The Overseas Companies Regulations (SI 2009/1801)
- The Companies Act 2006 (Part 35) (Consequential Amendments, Transitional Provisions and Savings) Order (SI 2009/1802)
- The Registrar of Companies and Applications for Striking Off Regulations (SI 2009/1803)
- The Limited Liability Partnerships (Application of Companies Act 2006) Regulations (SI 2009/1804)
- The Amendments to Law (Resolution of Dunfermline Building Society) (No. 2) Order (SI 2009/1805)
- The Road Vehicles (Construction and Use) (Amendment) (No. 2) Regulations (SI 2009/1806)
- The Housing Renewal Grants (Amendment) (England) Regulations (SI 2009/1807)
- The General Dental Council (Constitution) Order (SI 2009/1808)
- The Licensing Act 2003 (Premises Licences and Club Premises Certificates) (Miscellaneous Amendments) Regulations (SI 2009/1809)
- The Dunfermline Building Society Independent Valuer Order (SI 2009/1810)
- The Data Protection (Processing of Sensitive Personal Data) Order (SI 2009/1811)
- The Wireless Telegraphy (Short Range Devices) (Exemption) Regulations (SI 2009/1812)
- The General Dental Council (Constitution of Committees) Rules Order of Council (SI 2009/1813)
- The Motorways Traffic (M42 Motorway) (Junctions 10 to 11 Northbound) (Restriction on Use of Offside Lane) Regulations (SI 2009/1814)
- The Child Support Collection and Enforcement (Deduction Orders) Amendment Regulations (SI 2009/1815)
- The Home Energy Efficiency Scheme (England) (Amendment) Regulations (SI 2009/1816)
- The Rehabilitation of Offenders Act 1974 (Exceptions) (Amendment) (England and Wales) Order (SI 2009/1818)
- The National Health Service (Restructuring of National Health Service Bodies: Consequential Amendments) (Wales) Order (SI 2009/1824)
- The Assured and Protected Tenancies (Lettings to Students) (Amendment) (England) Regulations (SI 2009/1825)
- The Banking Act 2009 (Restriction of Partial Property Transfers) (Amendment) Order (SI 2009/1826)
- The Stamp Duty and Stamp Duty Reserve Tax (Investment Exchanges and Clearing Houses) Regulations (No. 8) (SI 2009/1827)
- The Stamp Duty and Stamp Duty Reserve Tax (Investment Exchanges and Clearing Houses) Regulations (No. 9) (SI 2009/1828)
- The Working Tax Credit (Entitlement and Maximum Rate) (Amendment) Regulations (SI 2009/1829)
- The International Monetary Fund (Limit on Lending) Order (SI 2009/1830)
- The Stamp Duty and Stamp Duty Reserve Tax (Investment Exchanges and Clearing Houses) Regulations (No. 10) (SI 2009/1831)
- The Stamp Duty and Stamp Duty Reserve Tax (Investment Exchanges and Clearing Houses) Regulations (No. 11) (SI 2009/1832)
- The Limited Liability Partnerships (Amendment) Regulations (SI 2009/1833)
- The Transfer of Functions of the Charity Tribunal Order (SI 2009/1834)
- The Transfer of Functions of the Consumer Credit Appeals Tribunal Order (SI 2009/1835)
- The Transfer of Functions (Estate Agents Appeals and Additional Scheduled Tribunal) Order (SI 2009/1836)
- The Gambling (Operating Licence and Single-Machine Permit Fees) (Amendment) Regulations (SI 2009/1837)
- The National Health Service (General Medical Services Contracts) (Prescription of Drugs Etc.) (Wales) (Amendment) Regulations (SI 2009/1838)
- The Violent Crime Reduction Act 2006 (Drinking Banning Orders) (Approved Courses) Regulations (SI 2009/1839)
- The Violent Crime Reduction Act 2006 (Commencement No. 7) Order (SI 2009/1840)
- The Welsh College of Horticulture (Dissolution) Order (SI 2009/1841)
- The Criminal Justice and Immigration Act 2008 (Commencement No. 10) Order (SI 2009/1842)
- The Criminal Defence Service (Funding) (Amendment) Order (SI 2009/1843)
- The School Admissions Code (Appointed Day) (Wales) Order (SI 2009/1844)
- The School Admission Appeals Code (Appointed Day) (Wales) Order (SI 2009/1845)
- The General and Specialist Medical Practice (Education, Training and Qualifications) Amendment Order (SI 2009/1846)
- The Sea Fishing (Enforcement of Community Control Measures) (Amendment) Order (SI 2009/1847)
- The Housing Benefit and Council Tax Benefit (Child Benefit Disregard and Child Care Charges) Regulations (SI 2009/1848)
- The Council Tax Limitation (Maximum Amounts) (England) Order (SI 2009/1849)
- The European Parliamentary Elections (Loans and Related Transactions and Miscellaneous Provisions) (United Kingdom and Gibraltar) Order (SI 2009/185])
- The Sea Fishing (Landing and Weighing of Herring, Mackerel and Horse Mackerel) Order (SI 2009/1850)
- The Financial Assistance Scheme (Miscellaneous Provisions) Regulations (SI 2009/1851)
- The Export Control (Amendment) (No. 2) Order (SI 2009/1852)
- The Criminal Defence Service (General) (No. 2) (Amendment) Regulations (SI 2009/1853)
- The Community Legal Service (Funding) (Counsel in Family Proceedings) (Amendment) Order (SI 2009/1854)
- The Capital Allowances (Energy-saving Plant and Machinery) (Amendment) Order (SI 2009/1863)
- The Capital Allowances (Environmentally Beneficial Plant and Machinery) (Amendment) Order (SI 2009/1864)
- The Police Act 1997 (Criminal Records) (No. 2) Regulations (SI 2009/1882)
- The Terrorism Act 2006 (Disapplication of Section 25) Order (SI 2009/1883)
- The Lasting Powers of Attorney, Enduring Powers of Attorney and Public Guardian (Amendment) Regulations (SI 2009/1884)
- The Transfer of Functions (Transport Tribunal and Appeal Panel) Order (SI 2009/1885)
- The Loan Relationships and Derivative Contracts (Disregard and Bringing into Account of Profits and Losses) (Amendment) Regulations (SI 2009/1886)
- The Community Care, Services for Carers and Children's Services (Direct Payments) (England) Regulations (SI 2009/1887)
- The Pensions Regulator (Delegation of Powers) Regulations (SI 2009/1888)
- The Companies Act 2006 (Consequential Amendments) (Uncertificated Securities) Order (SI 2009/1889)
- The Companies Act 2006 (Consequential Amendments) (Taxes and National Insurance) Order (SI 2009/1890)
- The Human Fertilisation and Embryology (Appeals) Regulations (SI 2009/1891)
- The Human Fertilisation and Embryology (Consequential Amendments and Transitional and Saving Provisions) Order (SI 2009/1892)
- The Non-Contentious Probate (Amendment) Rules (SI 2009/1893)
- The Community Legal Service (Financial) (Amendment No. 2) Regulations (SI 2009/1894)
- The Care Standards and Adoption (Regulation of Establishments, Agencies and Adult Placement Schemes) (Amendment) Regulations (SI 2009/1895)
- The Motor Cycles Etc. (Replacement of Catalytic Converters) Regulations (SI 2009/1896)
- The Natural Mineral Water, Spring Water and Bottled Drinking Water (Wales) (Amendment) Regulations (SI 2009/1897)
- The Voluntary Adoption Agencies and the Adoption Agencies (Miscellaneous Amendments)(Amendment) Regulations (SI 2009/1898)
- The Motor Vehicles (Replacement of Catalytic Converters and Pollution Control Devices) Regulations (SI 2009/1899)
- The Energy Performance of Buildings (Certificates and Inspections) (England and Wales) (Amendment) Regulations (SI 2009/1900)

== 1901–2000 ==
- The Planning (Hazardous Substances) (Amendment) (England) Regulations (SI 2009/1901)
- The National Minimum Wage Regulations 1999 (Amendment) Regulations (SI 2009/1902)
- The Work and Families (Increase of Maximum Amount) Order (SI 2009/1903)
- The Electricity and Gas (Carbon Emissions Reduction) (Amendment) Order (SI 2009/1904)
- The Electricity and Gas (Community Energy Saving Programme) Order (SI 2009/1905)
- The Occupational Pension Schemes (Scottish Parliamentary Pensions Act 2009) Regulations (SI 2009/1906)
- The Occupational Pension Schemes (Public Service Pension Schemes) Regulations (SI 2009/1907)
- The Products of Animal Origin (Disease Control) (Wales) (Amendment) (No. 2) Regulations (SI 2009/1910)
- The Financial Restrictions Proceedings (UN Terrorism Orders) Order (SI 2009/1911)
- The Terrorism (United Nations Measures) Order (Consequential Amendments) Regulations (SI 2009/1912)
- The General Medical Council (Fitness to Practise) (Amendment) Rules Order of Council (SI 2009/1913)
- The Heavy Goods Vehicles (Charging for the Use of Certain Infrastructure on the Trans-European Road Network) Regulations (SI 2009/1914)
- The Houses in Multiple Occupation (Management) (Wales) Regulations (SI 2009/1915)
- The Information Notice: Resolution of Disputes as to Privileged Communications Regulations (SI 2009/1916)
- The Overseas Companies (Execution of Documents and Registration of Charges) Regulations (SI 2009/1917)
- The Human Fertilisation and Embryology (Special Exemption) Regulations (SI 2009/1918)
- The Local Authorities (Overview and Scrutiny Committees) (England) Regulations (SI 2009/1919)
- The Parliamentary Pensions (Amendment) Regulations (SI 2009/1920)
- The Children and Young Persons Act 2008 (Commencement No. 2) (Wales) Order (SI 2009/1921)
- The Police and Criminal Evidence Act 1984 (Armed Forces) Order (SI 2009/1922)
- The Armed Forces (Disposal of Property) Regulations (SI 2009/1923)
- The Education (Miscellaneous Amendments relating to Safeguarding Children) (England) Regulations (SI 2009/1924)
- The Animals and Animal Products (Examination for Residues and Maximum Residue Limits) (Amendment) Regulations (SI 2009/1925)
- The General Insurers' Technical Provisions (Appropriate Amount) (Tax) Regulations (SI 2009/1926)
- The Major Accident Off-Site Emergency Plan (Management of Waste from Extractive Industries) (England and Wales) Regulations (SI 2009/1927)
- The Hillingdon Hospital National Health Service Trust (Transfer of Trust Property) Order (SI 2009/1928)
- The Landfill Tax (Prescribed Landfill Site Activities) Order (SI 2009/1929)
- The Landfill Tax (Amendment) Regulations (SI 2009/1930)
- The Solicitors' (Non-Contentious Business) Remuneration Order (SI 2009/1931)
- The Legislative Reform (Limited Partnerships) Order (SI 2009/1940)
- The Companies Act 2006 (Consequential Amendments, Transitional Provisions and Savings) Order (SI 2009/1941)
- The Community Interest Company (Amendment) Regulations (SI 2009/1942)
- The Public Service Vehicles (Enforcement Powers) Regulations (SI 2009/1964)
- The Goods Vehicles (Enforcement Powers) (Amendment) Regulations (SI 2009/1965)
- The Value Added Tax (Buildings and Land) Order (SI 2009/1966)
- The Value Added Tax (Amendment) (No. 3) Regulations (SI 2009/1967)
- The Welsh Authority (Digital Switchover) Order (SI 2009/1968)
- The Glasgow Commonwealth Games Act 2008 (Games Association Right) Order (SI 2009/1969)
- The Gambling Act 2005 (Gaming Tables in Casinos) (Definitions) Regulations (SI 2009/1970)
- The Gambling (Personal Licence Fees) (Amendment) Regulations (SI 2009/1971)
- The Financial Markets and Insolvency (Settlement Finality) (Amendment) Regulations (SI 2009/1972)
- The Whole of Government Accounts (Designation of Bodies) Order (SI 2009/1973)
- The School Teachers' Incentive Payments (England) Order (SI 2009/1974)
- The Tribunal Procedure (Amendment No. 2) Rules (SI 2009/1975)
- The Tribunal Procedure (First-tier Tribunal) (General Regulatory Chamber) Rules (SI 2009/1976)
- The National Health Service (General Medical Services Contracts) (Prescription of Drugs Etc.) (Wales) (Amendment) (No.2) Regulations (SI 2009/1977)
- The Scottish Parliament (Elections etc.) (Amendment) Order (SI 2009/1978)
- The Taxation of Pension Schemes (Transitional Provisions) (Amendment No. 2) Order (SI 2009/1989)
- The General Osteopathic Council (Registration of Osteopaths with United Kingdom Qualifications that are not Recognised Qualifications) Rules Order of Council (SI 2009/1993)
- The Individual Savings Account (Amendment No. 2) Regulations (SI 2009/1994)
- The Criminal Defence Service (Provisional Representation Orders) Regulations (SI 2009/1995)
- The Land Registration (Amendment) Rules (SI 2009/1996)

== 2001–2100 ==
- The Commons Registration (England) (Amendment) Regulations (SI 2009/2018)
- The Criminal Justice and Immigration Act 2008 (Violent Offender Orders) (Notification Requirements) Regulations (SI 2009/2019)
- The Air Navigation (Restriction of Flying) (London Stansted Airport) (No. 2) Regulations (SI 2009/2020)
- The Merchant Shipping (Marine Equipment) (Amendment) Regulations (SI 2009/2021)
- The Companies (Share Capital and Acquisition by Company of its Own Shares) Regulations (SI 2009/2022)
- The Family Law Act 1996 (Forced Marriage)(Relevant Third Party) Order (SI 2009/2023)
- The Commonhold (Land Registration) (Amendment) Rules (SI 2009/2024)
- The Family Proceedings Courts (Miscellaneous Amendments) (No.2) Rules (SI 2009/2025)
- The Parental Responsibility Agreement (Amendment) Regulations (SI 2009/2026)
- The Family Proceedings (Amendment) (No.3) Rules (SI 2009/2027)
- The Social Security (Contributions) (Amendment No. 4) Regulations (SI 2009/2028)
- The Income Tax (Pay As You Earn) (Amendment No. 2) Regulations (SI 2009/2029)
- The Income Tax (Construction Industry Scheme) (Amendment) Regulations (SI 2009/2030)
- The Special Annual Allowance Charge (Application to Members of Currently-Relieved Non-UK Pension Schemes) Order (SI 2009/2031)
- The Taxes and Duties (Interest Rate) (Amendment) Regulations (SI 2009/2032)
- The Tax Avoidance Schemes (Prescribed Descriptions of Arrangements) (Amendment) Regulations (SI 2009/2033)
- The Investment Trusts (Dividends) (Optional Treatment as Interest Distributions) Regulations (SI 2009/2034)
- The Finance Act 2009, Schedule 47 (Consequential Amendments) Order (SI 2009/2035)
- The Authorised Investment Funds (Tax) (Amendment) Regulations (SI 2009/2036)
- The Corporation Tax (Land Remediation Relief) Order (SI 2009/2037)
- The Banking Act 2009 (Commencement No. 3) Order (SI 2009/2038)
- The Lloyd's Underwriters (Equalisation Reserves) (Tax) Regulations (SI 2009/2039)
- The Hallmarking Act 1973 (Application to Palladium) Order (SI 2009/2040)
- The Armed Forces (Court Martial) Rules (SI 2009/2041)
- The Armed Forces (Civilian Courts Dealing with Service Offences) (Modification of the Criminal Justice Act 2003) Regulations (SI 2009/2042)
- The Zoonoses and Animal By-Products (Fees) (England) Regulations (SI 2009/2043)
- The Court Martial (Prosecution Appeals) Order (SI 2009/2044)
- The Air Passenger Duty (Amendment) Regulations (SI 2009/2045)
- The Gaming Duty (Amendment) Regulations (SI 2009/2046)
- The Pensions Schemes (Application of UK Provisions to Relevant Non-UK Schemes) (Amendment) Regulations (SI 2009/2047)
- The Port Security Regulations (SI 2009/2048)
- The Further Education (Principals' Qualifications) (England) (Amendment) (No. 2) Regulations (SI 2009/2049)
- The Income and Corporation Taxes (Electronic Certificates of Deduction of Tax and Tax Credit) (Amendment) Regulations (SI 2009/2050)
- The Aircraft Operators (Accounts and Records) (Amendment) Regulations (SI 2009/2051)
- The Alternative Finance Investment Bonds (Stamp Duty Land Tax) (Prescribed Evidence) Regulations (SI 2009/2052)
- The Plant Health (Import Inspection Fees) (England) (Amendment) Regulations (SI 2009/2053)
- The Armed Forces Act 2006 (Consequential Amendments) Order (SI 2009/2054)
- The Armed Forces (Part 5 of the Armed Forces Act 2006) Regulations (SI 2009/2055)
- The Armed Forces (Powers of Stop and Search, Search, Seizure and Retention) Order (SI 2009/2056)
- The Armed Forces (Enlistment) Regulations (SI 2009/2057)
- The Public Health Wales National Health Service Trust (Establishment) Order (SI 2009/2058)
- The Velindre National Health Service Trust (Establishment) (Amendment) Order (SI 2009/2059)
- The Police Pensions (Amendment) Regulations (SI 2009/2060)
- The Enterprise Act 2002 (Bodies Designated to make Super-complaints) (Amendment) Order (SI 2009/2079)
- The Local Justice Areas Order (SI 2009/2080)
- The Channel Tunnel (International Arrangements) (Amendment) Order (SI 2009/2081)
- The Youth Justice and Criminal Evidence Act 1999 (Application to Service Courts) Order (SI 2009/2083)
- The Motor Vehicles (Type Approval for Goods Vehicles) (Great Britain) (Amendment) Regulations (SI 2009/2084)
- The Workplace Parking Levy (England) Regulations (SI 2009/2085)
- The Criminal Defence Service (Funding) (Amendment No. 2) Order (SI 2009/2086)
- The Criminal Procedure (Amendment) Rules (SI 2009/2087)
- The Human Fertilisation and Embryology (Procedure for Revocation, Variation or Refusal of Licences) (Amendment) Regulations (SI 2009/2088)
- The Trade Marks and Trade Marks and Patents (Fees) (Amendment) Rules (SI 2009/2089)
- The Justice and Security (Northern Ireland) Act 2007 (Extension of duration of non-jury trial provisions) Order (SI 2009/2090)
- The Civil Procedure (Amendment) Rules (SI 2009/2092)
- The Value Added Tax (Emissions Allowances) Order (SI 2009/2093)
- The Finance (No. 2) Act 2005, Sections 48(1) to (4), (Appointed Day) Order (SI 2009/2094)
- The Stamp Duty Land Tax (Use of Information Contained in Land Transaction Returns) Regulations (SI 2009/2095)
- The Housing and Regeneration Act 2008 (Commencement No.6 and Transitional and Savings Provisions) Order (SI 2009/2096)
- The Housing (Shared Ownership Leases) (Exclusion from Leasehold Reform Act 1967) (England) Regulations (SI 2009/2097)
- The Housing (Right to Enfranchise) (Designated Protected Areas) (England) Order (SI 2009/2098)
- The Offshore Installations (Safety Zones) (No.2) Order (SI 2009/2099)
- The Court Martial and Service Civilian Court (Youth Justice and Criminal Evidence Act 1999) Rules (SI 2009/2100)

== 2101–2200 ==
- The Registrar of Companies (Fees) (Companies, Overseas Companies and Limited Liability Partnerships) Regulations (SI 2009/2101)
- The Ecclesiastical Judges, Legal Officers and Others (Fees) Order (SI 2009/2105)
- The Parochial Fees Order (SI 2009/2106)
- The Legal Officers (Annual Fees) Order (SI 2009/2107)
- The Ecclesiastical Offices (Terms of Service) Regulations (SI 2009/2108)
- The Church of England Pensions (Amendment) Regulations (SI 2009/2109)
- The Church Representation Rules (Amendment) Resolution (SI 2009/2129)
- The Communications Act 2003 (Commencement No. 4) Order (SI 2009/2130)
- The Supreme Court Fees Order (SI 2009/2131)
- The Education (School Teachers' Pay and Conditions) Order (SI 2009/2132)
- The UK Border Agency (Complaints and Misconduct) Regulations (SI 2009/2133)
- The Export Control (Amendment) (No. 3) Order (SI 2009/2151)
- The Non-Domestic Rating (Deferred Payments) (Wales) Regulations (SI 2009/2154)
- The Assembly Learning Grants and Loans (Higher Education) (Wales) (No. 2) (Amendment) Regulations (SI 2009/2156)
- The Assembly Learning Grants (European Institutions) (Wales) (Amendment) Regulations (SI 2009/2157)
- The Assembly Learning Grant (Further Education) Regulations (SI 2009/2158)
- The School Teacher Appraisal (Amendment) (Wales) Regulations (SI 2009/2159)
- The Limited Partnerships (Forms) Rules (SI 2009/2160)
- The General Teaching Council for Wales (Disciplinary Functions) (Amendment No. 2) Regulations (SI 2009/2161)
- The Welfare Reform Act (Relevant Enactment) Order (SI 2009/2162)
- The Eggs and Chicks (England) Regulations (SI 2009/2163)
- The Export of Objects of Cultural Interest (Control) (Amendment) Order (SI 2009/2164)
- The Registration of Births and Deaths (Amendment) (England and Wales) Regulations (SI 2009/2165)
- The Spring Traps Approval (Variation) (England) Order (SI 2009/2166)
- The Criminal Defence Service (General) (No. 2) (Amendment No. 2) Regulations (SI 2009/2167)
- The Transport for London (East London Line) Transfer Scheme 2009 Confirmation Order (SI 2009/2168)
- The Rules of the Air (Amendment) Regulations (SI 2009/2169)
- The Smoke Control Areas (Exempted Fireplaces) (England) (No.2) Order (SI 2009/2190)
- The Smoke Control Areas (Authorised Fuels) (England) (Amendment) Regulations (SI 2009/2191)
- The International Movement of Capital (Required Information) Regulations (SI 2009/2192)
- The Town and Country Planning (General Permitted Development) (Amendment) (Wales) Order (SI 2009/2193)
- The Motor Vehicles (Refilling of Air Conditioning Systems by Service Providers) Regulations (SI 2009/2194)
- The Counter-Terrorism Act 2008 (Designation of a Gas Transporter) Order (SI 2009/2195)
- The Road Vehicles (Construction and Use) (Amendment) (No. 3) Regulations (SI 2009/2196)
- The Magistrates' Courts (Violent Offender Orders) Rules (SI 2009/2197)
- The Designation of Schools Having a Religious Character (Independent Schools) (England) (No. 2) Order (SI 2009/2198)
- The Authorised Investment Funds (Tax) (Amendment No.2) Regulations (SI 2009/2199)
- The Medical Profession (Miscellaneous Amendments) Order 2008 (Commencement No. 2) Order of Council (SI 2009/2200)

== 2201–2300 ==
- The Purity Criteria for Colours, Sweeteners and Miscellaneous Food Additives (Wales) (Amendment) Regulations (SI 2009/2201)
- The Business Rate Supplements Act 2009 (Commencement No. 1) (England) Order (SI 2009/2202)
- The Diocese of Chester (Educational Endowments) Orde (SI 2009/2203)
- The Diocese of Newcastle (Educational Endowments) Order (SI 2009/2204)
- The National Health Service (Miscellaneous Amendments Relating to Community Pharmaceutical Services and Optometrist Prescribing) Regulations (SI 2009/2205)
- The Social Security (State Pension and National Insurance Credits) Regulations (SI 2009/2206)
- The Neath Harbour Revision (Constitution) Order (SI 2009/2207)
- The National Health Service (Prescribing and Charging Amendments Relating to Pandemic Influenza) Regulations (SI 2009/2230)
- The Judiciary and Courts (Scotland) Act 2008 (Consequential Provisions and Modifications) Order (SI 2009/2231)
- The Human Fertilisation and Embryology Act 2008 (Commencement No.2 and Transitional Provision) and (Commencement No.1 Amendment) Order (SI 2009/2232)
- The Adoption and Children (Scotland) Act 2007 (Consequential Provisions) (No. 1) Order (SI 2009/2233)
- The M62 and M606 Motorways (Chain Bar Roundabout) (Car Share Lane) Regulations (SI 2009/2247)
- The Street Works (Qualifications of Supervisors and Operatives) (England) Regulations (SI 2009/2257)
- The Marine Works (Environmental Impact Assessment)(Amendment)(England and Wales) Regulations (SI 2009/2258)
- The Felixstowe Dock and Railway Harbour Revision Order (SI 2009/2259)
- The Planning Act 2008 (Commencement No. 2) Order (SI 2009/2260)
- The Town and Country Planning (General Development Procedure) (Amendment No. 3) (England) Order (SI 2009/2261)
- The Planning (Listed Buildings and Conservation Areas) (Amendment) (England) Regulations (SI 2009/2262)
- The Infrastructure Planning (Environmental Impact Assessment) Regulations (SI 2009/2263)
- The Infrastructure Planning (Applications: Prescribed Forms and Procedure) Regulations (SI 2009/2264)
- The Infrastructure Planning (Model Provisions) (England and Wales) Order (SI 2009/2265)
- The Education (Supply of Information about the School Workforce) (No. 2) (England) (Amendment) Regulations (SI 2009/2266)
- The Valuation Tribunal for England (Membership and Transitional Provisions) Regulations (SI 2009/2267)
- The Non-Domestic Rating (Alteration of Lists and Appeals) (England) Regulations (SI 2009/2268)
- The Valuation Tribunal for England (Council Tax and Rating Appeals) (Procedure) Regulations (SI 2009/2269)
- The Council Tax (Alteration of Lists and Appeals) (England) Regulations (SI 2009/2270)
- The Valuation Tribunals (Consequential Modifications and Saving and Transitional Provisions) (England) Regulations (SI 2009/2271)
- The Local Authorities (Capital Finance and Accounting) (England) (Amendment) (No.2) Regulations (SI 2009/2272)
- The Children and Young Persons Act 2008 (Commencement No.2) (England) Order (SI 2009/2273)
- The Children Act 1989 (Higher Education Bursary)(England) Regulations (SI 2009/2274)
- The A35 Trunk Road (Morcombelake, Dorset) (40 mph Speed Limit) Order 2009 (SI 2009/2279)
- The A35 Trunk Road (40 mph Speed Limit) Order 1993 (Variation) Order 2009 (SI 2009/2280)
- The Veterinary Medicines Regulations (SI 2009/2297)
- The Houses in Multiple Occupation (Specified Educational Establishments) (England) Regulations (SI 2009/2298)
- The Education (Free School Lunches) (Child Tax Credit) (Wolverhampton City Council) Order (SI 2009/2300)

== 2301–2400 ==
- The Aviation Greenhouse Gas Emissions Trading Scheme Regulations (SI 2009/2301)
- The Smoke Control Areas (Exempted Fireplaces) (England) (No.3) Order (SI 2009/2302)
- The Identity Cards Act 2006 (Commencement No. 3) Order (SI 2009/2303)
- The Tonnage Tax (Training Requirement) (Amendment) Regulations (SI 2009/2304)
- The General Chiropractic Council (Registration) (Amendment) Rules Order of Council (SI 2009/2305)
- The A27 Trunk Road (Polegate) (Speed Limits) Order 2009 (SI 2009/2316)
- The Penzance Harbour Revision Order (SI 2009/2325)
- The Financial Transparency (EC Directive) Regulations (SI 2009/2331)
- The Seed Potatoes (England) (Amendment) Regulations (SI 2009/2342)
- The Social Security (Miscellaneous Amendments) (No. 3) Regulations (SI 2009/2343)
- The Electricity (Exemption from the Requirement for a Generation Licence) (Lynn and Inner Dowsing) (England and Wales) Order (SI 2009/2344)
- The Aerodromes (Designation)(Detention and Sale of Aircraft)(England and Wales) Order (SI 2009/2350)
- The Air Navigation (Restriction of Flying) (Jet Formation Display Teams) (No. 3) (Amendment) Regulations 2009 (SI 2009/2351)
- The Air Navigation (Restriction of Flying) (Northampton Sywell) Regulations 2009 (SI 2009/2352)
- The Antarctic (Amendment) Regulations (SI 2009/2354)
- The Air Navigation (Restriction of Flying) (Southport) Regulations 2009 (SI 2009/2355)
- The Air Navigation (Restriction of Flying) (Plymouth) Regulations 2009 (SI 2009/2356)
- The Air Navigation (Restriction of Flying) (Bournemouth Air Festival) Regulations 2009 (SI 2009/2357)
- The Air Navigation (Restriction of Flying) (Royal Air Force Leuchars) Regulations 2009 (SI 2009/2358)
- The Air Navigation (Restriction of Flying) (Merthyr Tydfil) Regulations 2009 (SI 2009/2359)
- The Air Navigation (Restriction of Flying) (Merthyr Tydfil) (Revocation) Regulations 2009 (SI 2009/2360)
- The Motor Vehicles (Driving Licences) (Amendment) (No. 2) Regulations (SI 2009/2362)
- The Commonhold (Amendment) Regulations (SI 2009/2363)
- The London Underground (Victoria Station Upgrade) Order (SI 2009/2364)
- The National Health Service (Travelling Expenses and Remission of Charges) (Wales) (Amendment) (No.3) Regulations (SI 2009/2365)
- The Insolvency (Scotland) Amendment (No. 2) Rules (SI 2009/2375)
- The Mental Health and Mental Capacity (Advocacy) Amendment (England) Regulations (SI 2009/2376)
- The Registrar of Companies (Fees) (Limited Partnerships and Newspaper Proprietors) Regulations (SI 2009/2392)
- The Local Government (Best Value Authorities) (Power to Trade) (England) Order (SI 2009/2393)
- The Protection of Wrecks (Designation) (England) Order (SI 2009/2394)
- The Political Parties and Elections Act 2009 (Commencement No.1 and Transitional Provisions) Order (SI 2009/2395)
- The Enterprise Act 2002 (Merger Fees) (Amendment) Order (SI 2009/2396)
- The Building (Amendment No.2) Regulations (SI 2009/2397)
- The Private Security Industry Act 2001 (Licences) Regulations 2007 (Amendment No. 2) Regulations (SI 2009/2398)
- The European Economic Interest Grouping (Amendment) Regulations (SI 2009/2399)
- The European Public Limited-Liability Company (Amendment) Regulations (SI 2009/2400)

== 2401–2500 ==
- The European Public Limited-Liability Company (Employee Involvement) (Great Britain) Regulations (SI 2009/2401)
- The European Public Limited-Liability Company (Employee Involvement) (Northern Ireland) Regulations (SI 2009/2402)
- The Registrar of Companies (Fees) (European Economic Interest Grouping and European Public Limited-Liability Company) Regulations (SI 2009/2403)
- The Company, Limited Liability Partnership and Business Names (Miscellaneous Provisions) (Amendment) Regulations (SI 2009/2404)
- The Companies (Authorised Minimum) Regulations (SI 2009/2425)
- The Accession (Worker Authorisation and Worker Registration) (Amendment) Regulations (SI 2009/2426)
- The Zoonoses and Animal By-Products (Fees) (Wales) (Amendment) Regulations (SI 2009/2427)
- The Police Act 1997 (Criminal Records) (Amendment) Regulations (SI 2009/2428)
- The Unregistered Companies Regulations (SI 2009/2436)
- The Companies (Companies Authorised to Register) Regulations (SI 2009/2437)
- The Conservation (Natural Habitats, &c.) (Amendment) (No. 2) Regulations (SI 2009/2438)
- The Registrar of Companies (Fees) (Amendment) Regulations (SI 2009/2439)
- The National Health Service Pension Scheme, Injury Benefits and Additional Voluntary Contributions (Amendment) Regulations (SI 2009/2446)
- The Civil Courts (Amendment) Order (SI 2009/2455)
- The Public Interest Disclosure (Prescribed Persons) (Amendment) Order (SI 2009/2457)
- The Climate Change Agreements (Eligible Facilities) (Amendment) Regulations (SI 2009/2458)
- The Rent Officers (Housing Benefit Functions) Amendment Order (SI 2009/2459)
- The National Savings Bank (Investment Deposits) (Limits) (Amendment) Order (SI 2009/2460)
- The Financial Services and Markets Act 2000 (Amendment) Regulations (SI 2009/2461)
- The Financial Collateral Arrangements (No. 2) Regulations 2003 (Amendment) Regulations (SI 2009/2462)
- The Measuring Equipment (Intoxicating Liquor) (Amendment) Regulations (SI 2009/2463)
- The Trade Marks (International Registration) (Amendment) Order (SI 2009/2464)
- The Building and Approved Inspectors (Amendment No.2) Regulations (SI 2009/2465)
- The Northern Ireland Act 2009 (Commencement No. 1) Order (SI 2009/2466)
- The Central Lincolnshire Joint Strategic Planning Committee Order (SI 2009/2467)
- The Constitutional Reform Act 2005 (Consequential Amendments) Order (SI 2009/2468)
- The Companies (Unfair Prejudice Applications) Proceedings Rules (SI 2009/2469)
- The Equine Identification (Wales) Regulations (SI 2009/2470)
- The Companies (Disqualification Orders) Regulations (SI 2009/2471)
- The Insolvency (Amendment) (No. 2) Rules (SI 2009/2472)
- The Veterinary Surgeons (Registration Appeals) Rules Order of Council (SI 2009/2474)
- The Payment Services (Amendment) Regulations (SI 2009/2475)
- The Companies Act 2006 and Limited Liability Partnerships (Transitional Provisions and Savings) (Amendment) Regulations (SI 2009/2476)
- The Water Industry (Special Administration) Rules (SI 2009/2477)
- The Human Fertilisation and Embryology (Supplementary Provision) Order (SI 2009/2478)
- The A595 (Parton to Lillyhall Improvement) (50 Miles Per Hour Speed Limit) Order 2009 (SI 2009/2486)
- The European Economic Interest Grouping and European Public Limited-Liability Company (Fees) Revocation Regulations (SI 2009/2492)
- The Counter-Terrorism Act 2008 (Foreign Travel Notification Requirements) Regulations (SI 2009/2493)
- The Local Land Charges (Amendment) Rules (SI 2009/2494)
- The Police Act 1997 (Criminal Records) (Disclosure) (Amendment No. 2) Regulations (Northern Ireland) (SI 2009/2495)
- The Parliamentary Standards Act 2009 (Commencement No. 1) Order (SI 2009/2500)

== 2501–2600 ==
- Domestic Violence, Crime and Victims Act 2004 (Commencement No. 11) Order 2009 (SI 2009/2501)
- Medicines (Pharmacies) (Applications for Registration and Fees – Amendment) Regulations 2009 (SI 2009/2502)
- Vaccine Damage Payments (Specified Disease) Order 2009 (SI 2009/2516)
- Wireless Telegraphy (Ultra-Wideband Equipment) (Exemption) Regulations 2009 (SI 2009/2517)
- Food Labelling (Nutrition Information) (England) Regulations 2009 (SI 2009/2538)
- Local Government and Public Involvement in Health Act 2007 (Commencement No. 2) (Wales) Order 2009 (SI 2009/2539)
- Police and Justice Act 2006 (Commencement No. 2) (Wales) Order 2009 (SI 2009/2540)
- Children Act 1989, Care Standards Act 2000 and Adoption and Children Act 2002 (Miscellaneous Amendments) (Wales) Regulations 2009 (SI 2009/2541)
- Business Rate Supplements (Rateable Value Condition) (England) Regulations 2009 (SI 2009/2542)
- Business Rate Supplements (Transfers to Revenue Accounts) (England) Regulations 2009 (SI 2009/2543)
- Education (Miscellaneous Amendments relating to Safeguarding Children) (Wales) Regulations 2009 (SI 2009/2544)
- Education and Inspections Act 2006 (Commencement No. 4 and Transitional Provisions) (Wales) Order 2009 (SI 2009/2545)
- Education (Independent Schools) (Unsuitable Persons) (Wales) Regulations 2009 (SI 2009/2558)
- Energy Information (Miscellaneous Amendments) Regulations 2009 (SI 2009/2559)
- Ecodesign for Energy-Using Products (Amendment) Regulations 2009 (SI 2009/2560)
- Companies Act 2006 (Allotment of Shares and Right of Pre-emption) (Amendment) Regulations 2009 (SI 2009/2561)
- Cosmetic Products (Safety) (Amendment No. 3) Regulations 2009 (SI 2009/2562)
- Adoptions with a Foreign Element (Amendment) Regulations 2009 (SI 2009/2563)
- Income-related Benefits (Subsidy to Authorities) Amendment (No.2) Order 2009 (SI 2009/2564)
- Identity Cards Act 2006 (Commencement No. 4) Order 2009 (SI 2009/2565)
- Health and Social Care Act 2008 (Commencement No. 11) Order 2009 (SI 2009/2567)
- Alternative Finance Arrangements (Amendment) Order 2009 (SI 2009/2568)
- Court Martial Appeal Court (Evidence) Order 2009 (SI 2009/2569)
- Identity Cards Act 2006 (Information and Code of Practice on Penalties) Order 2009 (SI 2009/2570)
- Identity Cards Act 2006 (Civil Penalties) Regulations 2009 (SI 2009/2571)
- Identity Cards Act 2006 (Entitlement to be Registered) Regulations 2009 (SI 2009/2572)
- Planning Act 2008 (Commencement No. 3) Order 2009 (SI 2009/2573)
- Identity Cards Act 2006 (National Identity Registration Number) Regulations 2009 (SI 2009/2574)
- Identity Cards Act 2006 (Provision of Information with Consent) Regulations 2009 (SI 2009/2575)
- Airport Byelaws (Designation) Order 2009 (SI 2009/2576)
- London Olympic Games and Paralympic Games Act 2006 (Commencement No. 3) Order 2009 (SI 2009/2577)
- Local Authorities (Case and Interim Case Tribunals and Standards Committees) (Amendment) (Wales) Regulations 2009 (SI 2009/2578)
- Manchester Ship Canal Harbour Revision Order 2009 (SI 2009/2579)
- Income-related Benefits (Subsidy to Authorities) (Temporary Accommodation) Amendment Order 2009 (SI 2009/2580)
- Human Fertilisation and Embryology (Statutory Storage Period for Embryos and Gametes) (Amendment) Regulations 2009 (SI 2009/2581)

== 2601–2700 ==
- The Mersey Docks and Harbour Revision Order (SI 2009/2604)
- The Crime (International Co-operation) Act 2003 (Commencement No. 5) Order (SI 2009/2605)
- The Criminal Justice and Immigration Act 2008 (Commencement No. 11) Order (SI 2009/2606)
- The National Health Service (Free Prescriptions and Charges for Drugs and Appliances) (Wales) (Amendment) Regulations (SI 2009/2607)
- The Housing Benefit and Council Tax Benefit (Miscellaneous Amendments) Regulations (SI 2009/2608)
- The Safeguarding Vulnerable Groups Act 2006 (Regulated Activity, Miscellaneous and Transitional Provisions and Commencement No. 5) Order (SI 2009/2610)
- The Safeguarding Vulnerable Groups Act 2006 (Commencement No. 6, Transitional Provisions and Savings) Order (SI 2009/2611)
- The Parliamentary Standards Act 2009 (Commencement No. 2) Order (SI 2009/2612)
- The Valuation Tribunal for England (Membership and Transitional Provisions) (Amendment) Regulations (SI 2009/2613)
- The Tuberculosis Eradication (Wales) Order (SI 2009/2614)
- The Company, Limited Liability Partnership and Business Names (Sensitive Words and Expressions) Regulations (SI 2009/2615)
- The Domestic Violence, Crime and Victims Act 2004 (Commencement No. 12) Order (SI 2009/2616)
- The National Health Service (Transfer of Residual Estate) (Wales) Order (SI 2009/2617)
- The Welsh Ministers (Transfer of Property, Rights and Liabilities) (Wales) Order (SI 2009/2618)
- The Companies House Trading Fund (Amendment) Order (SI 2009/2622)
- The Wales Centre for Health (Transfer of Functions, Property, Rights and Liabilities and Abolition) (Wales) Order (SI 2009/2623)
- The Welsh College of Horticulture (Dissolution) (Amendment) Order (SI 2009/2633)
- The Planning and Compulsory Purchase Act 2004 (Commencement No.4 and Consequential, Transitional and Savings Provisions) (Wales) (Amendment No.1) Order (SI 2009/2645)
- The Charities Act 2006 (Commencement No.6 and Commencement No.5, Transitional and Transitory Provisions and Savings (Amendment)) Order (SI 2009/2648)
- The Social Fund Cold Weather Payments (General) Amendment Regulations (SI 2009/2649)
- The Social Security (Miscellaneous Amendments) (No. 4) Regulations (SI 2009/2655)
- The Court Martial Appeal Court Rules (SI 2009/2657)
- The Highway Litter Clearance and Cleaning (Transfer of Responsibility) (England) Order (SI 2009/2677)
- The Social Security Benefit (Computation of Earnings) (Amendment) Regulations (SI 2009/2678)
- The Social Security Benefit (Computation of Earnings) (Amendment) Regulations (Northern Ireland) (SI 2009/2679)
- The School Staffing (England) Regulations (SI 2009/2680)
- The M56 Motorway (Eastbound Link Road Leading to M60 Motorway Anticlockwise Between Junctions 3 and 2) (Temporary Prohibition of Traffic) Order (SI 2009/2681)
- The M6 Motorway (Junctions 38–39, Northbound Carriageway) (Temporary Restriction of Traffic) Order (SI 2009/2684)
- The Welfare Reform Act (Relevant Enactment) (Wales) Order (SI 2009/2687)

== 2701–2800 ==
- Food Labelling (Nutrition Information) (Wales) Regulations 2009 (SI 2009/2705)
- Council Tax and Non-Domestic Rating (Electronic Communications) (Wales) Order 2009 (SI 2009/2706)
- Proceeds of Crime Act 2002 (References to Financial Investigators) (Amendment) Order 2009 (SI 2009/2707)
- Staffing of Maintained Schools (Wales) (Amendment) Regulations 2009 (SI 2009/2708)
- Social Security (Flexible New Deal) (No. 2) Regulations 2009 (SI 2009/2710)
- Planning (Listed Buildings and Conservation Areas) (Amendment No. 2) England) Regulations 2009 (SI 2009/2711)
- Animals (Divisional Veterinary Managers) Regulations 2009 (SI 2009/2712)
- Animal Health (Divisional Veterinary Managers) Order 2009 (SI 2009/2713)
- Pensions Act 2007 (Supplementary Provision) Order 2009 (SI 2009/2715)
- A421 Trunk Road (A421/A600 Junction Westbound On Slip Road) Detrunking Order 2009 (SI 2009/2716)
- Conwy (Llandudno and Conwy) Order 2009 (SI 2009/2717)
- Wrexham (Communities) Order 2009 (SI 2009/2718)
- Costs in Criminal Cases (General) (Amendment) Regulations 2009 (SI 2009/2720)
- Prohibition of Fishing for Scallops (Wales) Order 2009 (SI 2009/2721)
- Office of the Health Professions Adjudicator Regulations 2009 (SI 2009/2722)
- Her Majesty's Chief Inspector of Education, Children's Services and Skills (Fees and Frequency of Inspections) (Children's Homes etc.) (Amendment) Regulations 2009 (SI 2009/2724)
- Financial Restrictions (Iran) Order 2009 (SI 2009/2725)
- Greater Manchester (Light Rapid Transit System) (Exemptions) Order 2009 (SI 2009/2726)
- Land Registration (Proper Office) (No. 2) Order 2009 (SI 2009/2727)
- Network Rail (Reading) (Land Acquisition) Order 2009 (SI 2009/2728)
- Persons Providing Education at Further Education Institutions in Wales (Conditions) (Amendment) Regulations 2009 (SI 2009/2730)
- Borders, Citizenship and Immigration Act 2009 (Commencement No. 1) Order 2009 (SI 2009/2731)
- City of Stoke-on-Trent (Scheme of Elections) Order 2009 (SI 2009/2734)
- A1 Trunk Road and the A1(M) Motorway (A5135 Junction – Junction 6) (Temporary Prohibition of Traffic) Order 2009 (SI 2009/2735)
- M4 Motorway (Junction 13, Westbound Slip Road) (Temporary Prohibition of Traffic) Order 2009 (SI 2009/2736)
- Assembly Learning Grants and Loans (Higher Education) (Wales) Regulations 2009 (SI 2009/2737)
- General Chiropractic Council (Constitution of the Statutory Committees) (Amendment) Rules Order of Council 2009 (SI 2009/2738)
- General Medical Council (Licence to Practise) Regulations Order of Council 2009 (SI 2009/2739)
- A27 Trunk Road (Firle – Berwick) (Temporary Speed Restrictions) Order 2009 Variation Order 2009 (SI 2009/2740)
- A3 Trunk Road (Berelands Interchange, Southbound Exit Slip Road) (Temporary Prohibition of Traffic) Order 2009 (SI 2009/2741)
- A303 Trunk Road (Weyhill – Winchester Road) (Temporary Speed Restrictions) Order 2009 (SI 2009/2742)
- European Communities (Designation) (No. 4) Order 2009 (SI 2009/2743)
- British Nationality Act 1981 (Amendment of Schedule 6) Order 2009 (SI 2009/2744)
- Copyright and Performances (Application to Other Countries) (Amendment) Order 2009 (SI 2009/2745)
- Patents (Convention Countries) (Amendment) Order 2009 (SI 2009/2746)
- Designs (Convention Countries) (Amendment) Order 2009 (SI 2009/2747)
- Secretary of State for Business, Innovation and Skills Order 2009 (SI 2009/2748)
- Copyright (Bermuda) Revocation Order 2009 (SI 2009/2749)
- Inspectors of Education, Children's Services and Skills (No. 3) Order 2009 (SI 2009/2750)
- General Medical Council (Constitution of Panels and Investigation Committee) (Amendment) Rules Order of Council 2009 (SI 2009/2751)
- General Medical Council (Registration Appeal Panels Procedure) (Amendment) Rules Order of Council 2009 (SI 2009/2752)
- A14 Trunk Road (Westley Interchange Junction 42 to Moreton Hall Interchange Junction 44, Near Bury St. Edmunds, Suffolk) (Temporary Restriction and Prohibition of Traffic) Order 2009 (SI 2009/2753)
- A66 Trunk Road (Brougham to Oasis Resurfacing) (Temporary Restriction and Prohibition of Traffic) Order 2009 (SI 2009/2754)
- A120 Trunk Road (West Street to East of Tey Road, Coggeshall Bypass, Essex) (Temporary Restriction and Prohibition of Traffic) Order 2009 (SI 2009/2755)
- A47 Trunk Road (C562 Norwich Road Roundabout, East of Swaffham to Sporle, Norfolk) (Temporary Restriction and Prohibition of Traffic) Order 2009 (SI 2009/2756)
- A19 Trunk Road (Easington Interchange to Seaton Interchange) (Temporary Prohibition of Traffic) Order 2009 (SI 2009/2758)
- Agricultural Holdings (Units of Production) (England) Order 2009 (SI 2009/2762)
- General Medical Council (Voluntary Erasure and Restoration following Voluntary Erasure) (Amendment) Regulations Order of Council 2009 (SI 2009/2763)
- General Medical Council (Restoration following Administrative Erasure) (Amendment) Regulations Order of Council 2009 (SI 2009/2764)
- General Medical Council (Fitness to Practise) (Disqualifying Decisions and Determinations by Regulatory Bodies) Procedure (Amendment) Rules Order of Council 2009 (SI 2009/2765)
- Working Time (Amendment) (No. 2) Regulations 2009 (SI 2009/2766)
- RTM Companies (Model Articles) (England) Regulations 2009 (SI 2009/2767)
- Extradition Act 2003 (Specification of Category 1 Territories) Order 2009 (SI 2009/2768)
- Veterinary Surgery (Artificial Insemination) (Amendment) Order 2009 (SI 2009/2769)
- A66 Trunk Road (Greta Bridge to Scotch Corner Interchange) (Temporary Restriction and Prohibition of Traffic) Order 2009 (SI 2009/2770)
- A12 Trunk Road (Copdock Mill Interchange Junction 33, Suffolk to Crown Interchange Junction 29, Essex) (Temporary Restriction and Prohibition of Traffic) Order 2009 (SI 2009/2771)
- A64 Trunk Road (Hopgrove Roundabout, York) (40 Miles Per Hour and 50 Miles Per Hour Speed Restriction) Order 2009 (SI 2009/2772)
- Criminal Justice Act 2003 (Conditional Cautions: Financial Penalties) Order 2009 (SI 2009/2773)
- Police and Justice Act 2006 (Commencement No. 12) Order 2009 (SI 2009/2774)
- Criminal Justice Act 2003 (Commencement No. 22) Order 2009 (SI 2009/2775)
- A1 Trunk Road (Warenford to Old Mousen) (Temporary Restriction and Prohibition of Traffic) Order 2009 (SI 2009/2776)
- Criminal Defence Service (General) (No. 2) (Amendment No. 3) Regulations 2009 (SI 2009/2777)
- A27 Trunk Road (Ashcombe Roundabout – Southerham Roundabout) (Temporary Prohibition of Traffic) Order 2009 (SI 2009/2778)
- Charges for Residues Surveillance (Amendment) Regulations 2009 (SI 2009/2779)
- Criminal Justice and Immigration Act 2008 (Commencement No. 12) Order 2009 (SI 2009/2780)
- Crime and Disorder Act 1998 (Youth Conditional Cautions: Financial Penalties) Order 2009 (SI 2009/2781)
- A3 Trunk Road (Clay Lane and Stoke Road) (Temporary Prohibition of Traffic) Order 2009 (SI 2009/2782)
- Kettering (Related Alterations) Order 2009 (SI 2009/2786)
- A21 Trunk Road (Pembury Road Interchange – Lamberhurst Road) (Temporary Restriction and Prohibition of Traffic) Order 2009 (SI 2009/2787)
- M27 Motorway (Junctions 1 – 2, Eastbound) (Temporary Prohibition of Traffic) Order 2009 (SI 2009/2788)
- A36 Trunk Road (Warminster and Heytesbury Bypass, Wiltshire) (Temporary Prohibition and Restriction of Traffic) Order 2009 (SI 2009/2789)
- A1 Trunk Road (Adderstone Junction to Station Road, Belford) (Temporary Restriction and Prohibition of Traffic) Order 2009 (SI 2009/2790)
- A66 Trunk Road (Bowes Bypass) (Temporary Restriction and Prohibition of Traffic) Order 2009 (SI 2009/2791)
- Artist's Resale Right (Amendment) Regulations 2009 (SI 2009/2792)
- Identity Cards Act 2006 (Provision of Information without Consent) Regulations 2009 (SI 2009/2793)
- Identity Cards Act 2006 (Prescribed Information) Regulations 2009 (SI 2009/2794)
- Identity Cards Act 2006 (Application and Issue of ID Card and Notification of Changes) Regulations 2009 (SI 2009/2795)
- Merchant Shipping (Anti-Fouling Systems) Regulations 2009 (SI 2009/2796)
- Corporation Tax (Implementation of the Mergers Directive) Regulations 2009 (SI 2009/2797)
- Statutory Auditors and Third Country Auditors (Amendment) Regulations 2009 (SI 2009/2798)
- A19 Trunk Road (The A1058 Coast Road Interchange) (Temporary Restriction and Prohibition of Traffic) Order 2009 (SI 2009/2799)

== 2801–2900 ==
- The Food Labelling (Declaration of Allergens) (England) Regulations (SI 2009/2801)
- The A194(M) Motorway and the A184 Trunk Road (Havannah Interchange to Testo's Roundabout) (Temporary Restriction and Prohibition of Traffic) Order (SI 2009/2802)
- The A3(M) Motorway (Junction 3, Northbound Exit Slip Road) (Temporary Prohibition of Traffic) Order (SI 2009/2803)
- The M4 Motorway (Junction 7, Westbound Slip Roads) (Temporary Prohibition of Traffic) Order (SI 2009/2804)
- The Identity Cards Act 2006 (Fees) Regulations (SI 2009/2805)
- The Registration of Marriages (Amendment) Regulations (SI 2009/2806)
- The A2 Trunk Road (Pepper Hill Junction, Slip Roads) (Temporary Prohibition of Traffic) Order (SI 2009/2807)
- The A11 Trunk Road (Chalk Farm to Thetford, Suffolk) (Temporary Prohibition of Traffic) Order (SI 2009/2808)
- The Energy Act 2008 (Commencement No. 4 and Transitional Provisions) Order (SI 2009/2809)
- The Manufactured Interest (Tax) (Amendment) Regulations (SI 2009/2810)
- The Income Tax (Manufactured Overseas Dividends) (Amendment) Regulations (SI 2009/2811)
- The A27 Trunk Road (Nyton Road) (Temporary Restriction and Prohibition of Traffic) Order (SI 2009/2812)
- The Offshore Gas Storage and Unloading (Licensing) Regulations (SI 2009/2813)
- The Offshore Exploration (Petroleum, and Gas Storage and Unloading) (Model Clauses) Regulations (SI 2009/2814)
- The M271 Motorway (M27 Junction 3 – Romsey Road Roundabout) (Temporary Prohibition of Traffic) Order (SI 2009/2815)
- The Public Transport Users' Committee for Wales (Establishment) Order (SI 2009/2816)
- The Pre-release Access to Official Statistics (Wales) Order (SI 2009/2818)
- The Learner Travel (Wales) Measure 2008 (Commencement No. 2) Order (SI 2009/2819)
- The Medicines for Human Use (Marketing Authorisations Etc.) Amendment Regulations (SI 2009/2820)
- The Registration of Marriages etc. (Electronic Communications and Electronic Storage) Order (SI 2009/2821)
- The Aerosol Dispensers Regulations (SI 2009/2824)
- The Feed (Specified Undesirable Substances) (England) Regulations (SI 2009/2825)
- The County Council of Somerset (River Tone Bridge) Scheme 2008 Confirmation Instrument (SI 2009/2826)
- The A12 Trunk Road (Boreham Interchange, Chelmsford, Essex) (Temporary Prohibition of Traffic and Pedestrians) Order (SI 2009/2828)
- The Controls on Dogs (Non-application to Designated Land) Order (SI 2009/2829)
- The A5 Trunk Road (Watling Street, Hockliffe, Bedfordshire) (Temporary Prohibition of Traffic) Order (SI 2009/2830)
- The M4 Motorway (Junctions 15–16) (Temporary Prohibition and Restriction of Traffic) (No. 2) Order (SI 2009/2831)
- The M5 Motorway (Junction 20 Southbound Entry Slip Road) (Temporary Prohibition of Traffic) Order (SI 2009/2832)
- The M602 Motorway (Junction 3 to 2 Westbound Carriageway, Junction 3 Entry and Junction 2 Exit Slip Roads) (Temporary Prohibition of Traffic) Order (SI 2009/2833)
- The M60 Motorway (Junction 23 Clockwise Exit Slip Road) (Temporary Prohibition of Traffic) Order (SI 2009/2834)
- The M6 Motorway (Junction 26–27, Northbound and Southbound Carriageways) (Temporary Prohibition and Restriction of Traffic) Order (SI 2009/2835)
- The M4 Motorway (Junction 17 – Junction 18) (Temporary Restriction of Traffic) Order (SI 2009/2836)
- The A500 Trunk Road (Hanchurch, Staffordshire) (Temporary Prohibition of Traffic in Laybys) Order (SI 2009/2837)
- The M5 Motorway (Junctions 16 – 17) (Temporary Restriction of Traffic) Order (SI 2009/2838)
- The A40 Trunk Road (Forest Gate to Lea Junction, Gloucestershire) (Temporary Prohibition of Traffic) Order (SI 2009/2839)
- The A31 Trunk Road (Near Seaman's Corner, Side Roads) (Temporary Prohibition of Traffic) Order (SI 2009/2840)
- The A34 Trunk Road (Milton Lane Footbridge) (Temporary Speed Restrictions) Order (SI 2009/2841)
- The A1(M) Motorway (Junction 59 to Junction 60) (Temporary Restriction and Prohibition of Traffic) Order (SI 2009/2842)
- The A1 Trunk Road (Eighton Lodge Interchange to Kingsway Interchange) (Temporary 50 Miles Per Hour Speed Restriction) Order (SI 2009/2843)
- The A66 Trunk Road (Yarm Road Interchange to Teesside Park Interchange) (Temporary Restriction and Prohibition of Traffic) Order (SI 2009/2844)
- The A69 Trunk Road (West Denton Interchange) (Temporary Prohibition of Traffic) Order (SI 2009/2845)
- The A1(M) Motorway (Junction 64 to Junction 62) (Temporary Restriction and Prohibition of Traffic) Order (SI 2009/2846)
- The A11 Trunk Road (Elveden, Suffolk to Thetford, Norfolk) (Temporary Prohibition of Traffic) Order (SI 2009/2847)
- The A12 Trunk Road (Harfrey's Road Roundabout to Vauxhall Roundabout, Great Yarmouth, Norfolk) (Temporary Restriction and Prohibition of Traffic) Order (SI 2009/2848)
- The Combined Fire and Rescue Services Schemes (Variation) (Wales) Order (SI 2009/2849)
- The A303 Trunk Road (Micheldever Junction, Westbound) (Temporary Prohibition of Traffic) Order (SI 2009/2850)
- The M4 Motorway (Junction 13) (Temporary Prohibition of Traffic) Order (SI 2009/2851)
- The M3 Motorway (Junction 11, Slip Roads) (Temporary Prohibition of Traffic) Order (SI 2009/2852)
- The A2 Trunk Road (Brenley Corner – Dunkirk) (Temporary Restriction and Prohibition of Traffic) Order (SI 2009/2853)
- The M25 Motorway and the A282 Trunk Road (Junctions 26 – 31) (Temporary Prohibition of Traffic) Order (SI 2009/2854)
- The A38 Trunk Road (Dobwalls Bypass, Cornwall) (Temporary Prohibition of Traffic) Order (SI 2009/2855)
- The A40 Trunk Road (Huntley Hill, Gloucestershire) (Temporary Restriction of Traffic) Order (SI 2009/2856)
- The M5 Motorway (Junction 30 Southbound Exit Slip Road) (Temporary Prohibition of Traffic) Order (SI 2009/2857)
- The Defamation Act 1996 (Commencement No. 4) Order (SI 2009/2858)
- The Income Tax Act 2007 (Amendment) (No. 2) Order (SI 2009/2859)
- The Corporation Tax Act 2009 (Amendment) Order (SI 2009/2860)
- The Hazardous Waste (Wales) (Amendment) Regulations (SI 2009/2861)
- The Health and Social Care Act 2008 (Commencement No. 12) Order (SI 2009/2862)
- The Local Services (Operation by Licensed Hire Cars) Regulations (SI 2009/2863)
- The School Teacher Appraisal (Wales) (Amendment No. 2) Regulations (SI 2009/2864)
- The M5 and M6 Motorways (M6 Junction 8) (Link Road) (Temporary Prohibition of Traffic) Order (SI 2009/2865)
- The M5 Motorway (Junctions 3 to 4) (Temporary Restriction and Prohibition of Traffic) Order (SI 2009/2866)
- The A500 Trunk Road (Talke Interchange to Tunstall Interchange, Staffordshire) (Temporary Prohibition of Traffic) Order (SI 2009/2867)
- The A50 Trunk Road (Blythe Bridge to Uttoxeter, Staffordshire) (Temporary Restriction and Prohibition of Traffic) Order (SI 2009/2868)
- The A52 and A453 Trunk Roads (Nottingham) (Link Road) (Temporary Prohibition of Traffic) Order (SI 2009/2869)
- The M1 Motorway (Junctions 15 – 14) (Temporary Restriction and Prohibition of Traffic) Order (SI 2009/2870)
- The A38 Trunk Road (Holbrook to Little Eaton, Derbyshire) (Temporary Prohibition of Traffic) Order (SI 2009/2872)
- The Primary Care Trusts (Establishment and Dissolution) Amendment Order (SI 2009/2873)
- The Bolton Primary Care Trust (Establishment) Amendment Order (SI 2009/2874)
- The Criminal Defence Service (Interests of Justice) Regulations (SI 2009/2875)
- The Criminal Defence Service (General) (No.2) (Amendment No.4) Regulations (SI 2009/2876)
- The Financial Services and Markets Act 2000 (Disclosure of Confidential Information) (Amendment) Regulations (SI 2009/2877)
- The Criminal Defence Service (Financial Eligibility) (Amendment) Regulations (SI 2009/2878)
- The Criminal Justice Act 2003 (Commencement Order No. 23) Order (SI 2009/2879)
- The Food Labelling (Declaration of Allergens) (Wales) Regulations (SI 2009/2880)
- The Feed (Specified Undesirable Substances) (Wales) Regulations (SI 2009/2881)
- The A1 Trunk Road (Long Bennington, Lincolnshire) (Temporary Prohibition of Traffic in Laybys) Order (SI 2009/2882)
- The M55 Motorway (Junctions 3–4 Westbound Carriageway and Junction 3 Westbound Exit Slip Road) (Temporary Prohibition and Restriction of Traffic) Order (SI 2009/2883)
- The M62 Motorway (Junction 11–12, Eastbound and Westbound Carriageways) (Temporary Prohibition and Restriction of Traffic) Order (SI 2009/2884)
- The A585 Trunk Road (Thornton Roundabout to Norcross Roundabout) (Temporary Prohibition and Restriction of Traffic) Order (SI 2009/2885)
- The Employer-Financed Retirement Benefits (Excluded Benefits for Tax Purposes) (Amendment) Regulations (SI 2009/2886)
- The Tax Credits (Miscellaneous Amendments) (No. 2) Regulations (SI 2009/2887)
- The Income Tax (Qualifying Child Care) (No. 2) Regulations (SI 2009/2888)
- The Lloyd's Underwriters (Tax) (Amendment) Regulations (SI 2009/2889)
- The Scotch Whisky Regulations (SI 2009/2890)
- The Worcestershire County Council (Diglis Bridge) Scheme 2009 Confirmation Instrument (SI 2009/2891)
- The Geneva Conventions and United Nations Personnel (Protocols) Act 2009 (Commencement No.1) Order (SI 2009/2892)
- The A1(M) Motorway (Junction 58 to Junction 59) and the A167 Trunk Road (Coatham Interchange) (Temporary Restriction and Prohibition of Traffic) Order (SI 2009/2893)
- The Nursing and Midwifery Council (Midwifery and Practice Committees) (Constitution) (Amendment) Rules Order of Council (SI 2009/2894)
- The A11 Trunk Road (Waterhall Interchange, Junction 38 to North of B1085 Dane Hill Road, Suffolk) (Temporary Restriction and Prohibition of Traffic) Order (SI 2009/2895)
- The A2 Trunk Road (Jubilee Way Bridge, Coastbound Carriageway) (Temporary Prohibition of Traffic) Order (SI 2009/2896)
- The A1(M) Motorway and the A1 Trunk Road (Redhouse Interchange to Wentbridge Interchange) (Temporary Restriction and Prohibition of Traffic) Order (SI 2009/2897)
- The A21 Trunk Road (Northbridge Street Roundabout) (Temporary Prohibition of Traffic) Order (SI 2009/2898)
- The A34 Trunk Road (Tot Hill – Beacon Hill) (Temporary Restriction and Prohibition of Traffic) Order (SI 2009/2899)
- The A47 Trunk Road (Dogsthorpe/Paston Interchange to Thorney Road, Eye, Peterborough) (Temporary Restriction and Prohibition of Traffic) Order (SI 2009/2900)

== 2901–3000 ==
- The A3(M) Motorway (Junction 5, Carriageways) (Temporary Prohibition of Traffic) Order (SI 2009/2901)
- The Groundwater (England and Wales) Regulations (SI 2009/2902)
- The M20 Motorway (Junctions 4 to 6 and Junctions 10 to 12, Slip Roads) (Temporary Prohibition of Traffic) Order (SI 2009/2903)
- The M27 Motorway (Junction 1, Westbound Exit Slip Road) (Temporary Prohibition of Traffic) Order (SI 2009/2904)
- The M25 and the M4 Motorways (Thorney Interchange) (Temporary Restriction and Prohibition of Traffic) (No.2) Order (SI 2009/2905)
- The A14 Trunk Road (Beyton Interchange Junction 46 to Woolpit Interchange Junction 47, Suffolk) (Temporary Restriction and Prohibition of Traffic) Order (SI 2009/2906)
- The A14 Trunk Road (Wherstead Interchange Junction 56 to Trimley Interchange Junction 59, Suffolk) (Temporary Restriction and Prohibition of Traffic) Order (SI 2009/2907)
- The Immigration (Restrictions on Employment) (Amendment) Order (SI 2009/2908)
- The Child Support (Miscellaneous Amendments) (No. 2) Regulations (SI 2009/2909)
- The A63 Trunk Road (Mytongate Gyratory to Queen Street Junction) (Temporary Prohibition of Traffic) Order (SI 2009/2910)
- The A1 Trunk Road (Fenwick Junction to Scremerston Junction) (Temporary Restriction and Prohibition of Traffic) Order (SI 2009/2911)
- The A36 Trunk Road (Stapleford to Stoford, Wiltshire) (Temporary Restriction of Traffic) Order (SI 2009/2912)
- The A1 Trunk Road (Guyzance Junction to Hitchcroft Junction) (Temporary Restriction and Prohibition of Traffic) Order (SI 2009/2913)
- The A259 Trunk Road (Guestling Thorn – Guestling Green) (Temporary Speed Restrictions) Order (SI 2009/2914)
- The Public Transport Users' Committee for Wales (Establishment) (Amendment) Order (SI 2009/2915)
- The A36 Trunk Road (Churchill Way West, Salisbury) (Temporary Prohibition of Traffic) Order (SI 2009/2916)
- The M3 Motorway and the M27 Motorway (Chilworth Interchange – M3 Junction 14, Northbound) (Temporary Prohibition of Traffic) Order (SI 2009/2917)
- The A160/A180 Trunk Roads (Brocklesby Interchange) (Temporary Restriction and Prohibition of Traffic) Order (SI 2009/2918)
- The M3 Motorway (Junctions 4A – 5) (Temporary Restriction and Prohibition of Traffic) Order (SI 2009/2919)
- The M2 Motorway (Junction 5) (Temporary Restriction and Prohibition of Traffic) Order (SI 2009/2920)
- The A303 Trunk Road (Ilchester to Furzehedge Junction, Near Mere) (Temporary Prohibition and Restriction of Traffic) Order (SI 2009/2921)
- The A259 Trunk Road (Little Common Road, Bexhill) (Temporary Prohibition of Traffic) Order (SI 2009/2922)
- The A303 Trunk Road (Chaddenwick Hill and Hanson Quarry Laybys, Wiltshire) (Temporary Prohibition of Traffic) Order (SI 2009/2923)
- The A46 Trunk Road (Ratcliffe on the Wreake to Six Hills, Leicestershire) (Temporary Prohibition of Traffic) Order (SI 2009/2924)
- The M5 Motorway (Junction 1, Sandwell) (Southbound Entry Slip Road) (Temporary Prohibition of Traffic) Order (SI 2009/2925)
- The A50 Trunk Road (Meir, Stoke-on-Trent) (Slip Road) (Temporary Prohibition of Traffic) Order (SI 2009/2926)
- The Offshore Installations (Safety Zones) (No. 3) Order (SI 2009/2927)
- The A5 Trunk Road (Westbound Carriageway between Dordon Roundabout and M42 Junction 10, Warwickshire) (Temporary Prohibition of Traffic) Order (SI 2009/2928)
- The M5 Motorway (Junction 7, Worcestershire) (Slip Road) (Temporary Prohibition of Traffic) Order (SI 2009/2929)
- The Occupational and Personal Pension Schemes (Authorised Payments) Amendment Regulations (SI 2009/2930)
- The M6 Motorway (Junction 12, Gailey, Staffordshire (Slip Road) (Temporary Prohibition of Traffic) Order (SI 2009/2931)
- The A49 Trunk Road (Dorrington to Longnor, Shropshire) (Temporary Restriction and Prohibition of Traffic) Order (SI 2009/2932)
- The A50 and A500 Trunk Roads (Stoke-on-Trent, Staffordshire) (Temporary Prohibition of Traffic) Order (SI 2009/2933)
- The A45 Trunk Road (Stretton-on-Dunsmore to Ryton-on-Dunsmore) (Temporary Restriction and Prohibition of Traffic) (No. 2) Order (SI 2009/2934)
- The M5 Motorway (Junction 9) (Slip Road) (Temporary Prohibition of Traffic) Order (SI 2009/2935)
- The M1 Motorway (Junction 24 – Junction 25) (Temporary Restriction and Prohibition of Traffic) Order (SI 2009/2936)
- The Magistrates' Courts (Drinking Banning Orders) Rules (SI 2009/2937)
- The Materials and Articles in Contact with Food (England) (Amendment) Regulations (SI 2009/2938)
- The Contaminants in Food (Wales) (Amendment) Regulations (SI 2009/2939)
- The Movement of Animals (Restrictions) (Wales) (Amendment) Order (SI 2009/2940)
- The M1 Motorway (Junctions 28 to 31) (Temporary Restriction and Prohibition of Traffic) Order (SI 2009/2941)
- The A50 Trunk Road (North of Castle Donington, Leicestershire) (Temporary Restriction and Prohibition of Traffic) Order (SI 2009/2942)
- The A500 Trunk Road (Staffordshire) (Temporary Prohibition and Restriction of Traffic) Order (SI 2009/2943)
- The M602 Motorway (Junctions 1–3 Eastbound and Westbound Carriageways and Exit and Entry Slip Roads) and Link Roads to and from the M60 Motorway (Temporary Prohibition of Traffic) Order (SI 2009/2944)
- The A14 Trunk Road (Junction 20, Ellington, Cambridgeshire)Westbound Entry Slip Road (Temporary Prohibition of Traffic) Order (SI 2009/2945)
- The A27 Trunk Road (Eastern Road – Warblington) (Temporary Restriction and Prohibition of Traffic) Order 2009 Variation Order (SI 2009/2946)
- The Caribbean Development Bank (Seventh Replenishment of the Unified Special Development Fund) Order (SI 2009/2947)
- The M2 Motorway (Junction 4, Londonbound) (Temporary Prohibition of Traffic) Order (SI 2009/2948)
- The A50 Trunk Road (Uttoxeter to Sawley) (Temporary Restriction and Prohibition of Traffic) Order (SI 2009/2949)
- The Youth Rehabilitation Order (Electronic Monitoring Requirement) Order (SI 2009/2950)
- The A303 Trunk Road (Popham Interchange – Winchester Road) (Temporary Prohibition of Traffic) Order (SI 2009/2951)
- The M3 Motorway (Junctions 9 – 8) (Temporary Prohibition of Traffic) Order (SI 2009/2952)
- The A13 and A1089 Trunk Roads (Wennington Interchange – Marshfoot Interchange) (Temporary Prohibition of Traffic) Order (SI 2009/2953)
- The Stamp Duty and Stamp Duty Reserve Tax (Investment Exchanges and Clearing Houses) Regulations (No.12) (SI 2009/2954)
- The Plant Health (Fees) (Forestry) (Amendment) Regulations (SI 2009/2956)
- The Waste Electrical and Electronic Equipment (Amendment) Regulations (SI 2009/2957)
- The Government of Wales Act 2006 (Consequential Modifications, Transitional Provisions and Saving) Order (SI 2009/2958)
- The A14 Trunk Road (Fishponds Way, Tothill Interchange to Bury Road Roundabout, Suffolk) (Temporary Prohibition of Traffic and Pedestrians) Order (SI 2009/2959)
- The A12 Trunk Road (Marylands Interchange, Junction 12 to Furze Hill Interchange, Junction 14, Brentwood, Essex) (Temporary Restriction and Prohibition of Traffic) Order (SI 2009/2960)
- The M4 Motorway (Junctions 18–19) (Temporary Prohibition and Restriction of Traffic) Order (SI 2009/2961)
- The M4 Motorway (Junction 22 Westbound Entry Slip Road) (Temporary Prohibition of Traffic) Order (SI 2009/2962)
- The A66 Trunk Road (Bassenthwaite Lake) (Temporary Prohibition and Restriction of Traffic) (No.4) Order (SI 2009/2963)
- The Private Security Industry Act 2001 (Exemption) (Aviation Security) Regulations 2006 (Amendment) Regulations (SI 2009/2964)
- The A47 Trunk Road (Junction 16 Bretton Interchange, City of Peterborough) (Temporary Restriction and Prohibition of Traffic) Order (SI 2009/2965)
- The A1 Trunk Road (Scurragh House Lane to Catterick South Interchange) (Temporary Restriction and Prohibition of Traffic) Order (SI 2009/2966)
- The A1(M) Motorway (Junction 44, Bramham Crossroads) (Temporary Prohibition of Traffic) Order (SI 2009/2967)
- The A38 Trunk Road (Glynn Valley, Near Bodmin) (Temporary Prohibition and Restriction of Traffic) Order (SI 2009/2968)
- The Export Control (Amendment) (No. 4) Order (SI 2009/2969)
- The Rail Passengers' Rights and Obligations (Exemptions) Regulations (SI 2009/2970)
- The Mutual Societies (Transfers of Business) (Tax) Regulations (SI 2009/2971)
- The Value Added Tax (Drugs and Medicines) Order (SI 2009/2972)
- The Railway Closures (Minor Modifications) Order (SI 2009/2973)
- The Statistics of Trade (Customs and Excise) (Amendment) Regulations (SI 2009/2974)
- The Stamp Duty and Stamp Duty Reserve Tax (Investment Exchanges and Clearing Houses) Regulations (No. 13) (SI 2009/2975)
- The Stamp Duty and Stamp Duty Reserve Tax (Investment Exchanges and Clearing Houses) Regulations (No. 14) (SI 2009/2976)
- The Stamp Duty and Stamp Duty Reserve Tax (Investment Exchanges and Clearing Houses) Regulations (No. 15) (SI 2009/2977)
- The Value Added Tax (Amendment) (No. 4) Regulations (SI 2009/2978)
- The Audiovisual Media Services Regulations (SI 2009/2979)
- The Seed Potatoes (Wales) (Amendment) Regulations (SI 2009/2980)
- The Legislative and Regulatory Reform (Regulatory Functions) (Amendment) Order (SI 2009/2981)
- The Company, Limited Liability Partnership and Business Names (Public Authorities) Regulations (SI 2009/2982)
- The Local Authorities (Executive Arrangements) (Functions and Responsibilities) (Wales) (Amendment) Regulations (SI 2009/2983)
- The School Organisation (Establishment and Discontinuance of Schools)(England)(Amendment) Regulations (SI 2009/2984)
- The M1 Motorway (Junction 47, Parlington) (Temporary Prohibition of Traffic) Order (SI 2009/2986)
- The M4 Motorway (Junctions 16–17) (Temporary Restriction of Traffic) Order (SI 2009/2987)
- The A38 Trunk Road (Island Shop to Lean Quarry Junction, Liskeard) (Temporary Prohibition and Restriction of Traffic) Order (SI 2009/2988)
- The M6 Motorway (Junction 37 Northbound and Southbound Exit and Entry Slip Roads) (Temporary Prohibition and Restriction of Traffic) Order (SI 2009/2989)
- The M54 Motorway (Junction 2 – M6 Junction 10A) (Temporary Prohibition of Traffic) Order (SI 2009/2990)
- The M53 Motorway (Junction 1, Northbound and Southbound Carriageways and Southbound Entry Slip Road) (Temporary Prohibition and Restriction of Traffic) Order (SI 2009/2991)
- The Public Contracts (Amendment) Regulations (SI 2009/2992)
- The Local Authorities (Alternative Arrangements) (Wales) (Amendment) Regulations (SI 2009/2993)
- The M55 Motorway (Junctions 3 – 4 Westbound Carriageway) (Temporary Restriction of Traffic) Order (SI 2009/2994)
- The Limited Liability Partnerships (Amendment) (No. 2) Regulations (SI 2009/2995)
- The Saving Gateway Accounts Regulations (SI 2009/2997)
- The Saving Gateway Accounts (No. 2) Regulations (SI 2009/2998)
- The Provision of Services Regulations (SI 2009/2999)
- The Banking Act 2009 (Commencement No. 4) Order (SI 2009/3000)

== 3001–3100 ==
- The Offshore Funds (Tax) Regulations (SI 2009/3001)
- The A19 Trunk Road (Layby at Billingham) (Temporary Prohibition of Traffic) Order (SI 2009/3002)
- The M5 Motorway (Junctions 10-11A) (Temporary Restriction of Traffic) Order (SI 2009/3004)
- The National Health Service (Charges to Overseas Visitors) (Amendment) (No.2) (Wales) Regulations (SI 2009/3005)
- The National Assembly for Wales (Legislative Competence) (Exceptions to Matters) Order (SI 2009/3006)
- The Inspectors of Education, Children's Services and Skills (No. 4) Order (SI 2009/3007)
- The Burma (Restrictive Measures) (Overseas Territories) Order (SI 2009/3008)
- The Films Co-Production Agreements (Amendment) Order (SI 2009/3009)
- The National Assembly for Wales (Legislative Competence) (Social Welfare) Order (SI 2009/3010)
- The Double Taxation Relief and International Tax Enforcement (Guernsey) Order (SI 2009/3011)
- The Double Taxation Relief and International Tax Enforcement (Jersey) Order (SI 2009/3012)
- The Double Taxation Relief and International Tax Enforcement (Virgin Islands) Order (SI 2009/3013)
- The Electoral Law Act (Northern Ireland) 1962 (Amendment) Order (SI 2009/3014)
- The Air Navigation Order (SI 2009/3015)
- The District Electoral Areas Commissioner (Northern Ireland) (Amendment) Order (SI 2009/3016)
- The Private Security Industry Act 2001 (Amendment) (Northern Ireland) Order (SI 2009/3017)
- The Carriage by Air (Revision of Limits of Liability under the Montreal Convention) Order (SI 2009/3018)
- The Welsh Ministers (Transfer of Functions) (No. 2) Order (SI 2009/3019)
- The Plant Health (Forestry) (Amendment) (No. 2) Order (SI 2009/3020)
- The Crime (International Co-operation) Act 2003 (Exercise of Functions) Order (SI 2009/3021)
- The Companies Act 2006 (Amendment of Section 413) Regulations (SI 2009/3022)
- The Health and Social Care Act 2008 (Commencement No. 13, Transitory and Transitional Provisions and Electronic Communications) Order (SI 2009/3023)
- The Finance Act 2008, Section 128 and Part 2 of Schedule 43 (Appointed Day, Transitional Provision and Savings) Order (SI 2009/3024)
- The A21 Trunk Road (B2244 Junction – Baldslow) (Temporary Restriction and Prohibition of Traffic) Order (SI 2009/3025)
- The M20 Motorway and the A20 Trunk Road (Junction 13, Londonbound Slip Roads) (Temporary Prohibition of Traffic) Order (SI 2009/3026)
- The A3 Trunk Road (Sheet, Link Roads) (Temporary Prohibition of Traffic) Order (SI 2009/3027)
- The A31 Trunk Road (Verwood Interchange, Westbound Slip Road) (Temporary Prohibition of Traffic) Order (SI 2009/3028)
- The Health Service Branded Medicines (Control of Prices and Supply of Information) Amendment Regulations (SI 2009/3030)
- The M27 Motorway (Junctions 8 and 9, Slip Roads) (Temporary Prohibition of Traffic) Order (SI 2009/3031)
- The Identity Cards Act 2006 (Commencement No. 5) Order (SI 2009/3032)
- The Social Fund (Applications and Miscellaneous Provisions) Amendment Regulations (SI 2009/3033)
- The A34 Trunk Road (Beedon, Southbound Exit Slip Road) (Temporary Prohibition of Traffic) Order (SI 2009/3034)
- The M27 Motorway (Junction 12, Westbound) (Temporary Prohibition of Traffic) Order (SI 2009/3035)
- The M1 Motorway and A414 Trunk Road (Junction 8, Hertfordshire) (Temporary Prohibition of Traffic) Order (SI 2009/3036)
- The A12 Trunk Road (Breydon Bridge, Great Yarmouth, Norfolk) (Temporary Prohibition of Traffic) (No.2) Order (SI 2009/3037)
- The M1 Motorway (Junction 44, Rothwell Haigh) (Temporary Restriction and Prohibition of Traffic) Order (SI 2009/3038)
- The A1(M) Motorway and the A1 Trunk Road (Dishforth Interchange to Scotch Corner Interchange) (Temporary Restriction and Prohibition of Traffic) Order (SI 2009/3039)
- The Administrative Justice and Tribunals Council (Listed Tribunals) (Amendment) Order (SI 2009/3040)
- The Flood Risk Regulations (SI 2009/3042)
- The Private Security Industry Act 2001 (Amendments to Schedule 2) Order (SI 2009/3043)
- The Immigration (Designation of Travel Bans) (Amendment) Order (SI 2009/3044)
- The Weights and Measures (Metrication Amendments) Regulations (SI 2009/3045)
- The Units of Measurement Regulations (SI 2009/3046)
- The County Borough of Bridgend (Communities) Order (SI 2009/3047)
- The Private Security Industry Act 2001 (Designated Activities) (Northern Ireland) Order (SI 2009/3048)
- The Health and Social Care Act 2008 (NHS Blood and Transplant Periodic Review) Regulations (SI 2009/3049)
- The Crime and Disorder Strategies (Prescribed Descriptions) (Wales) Order (SI 2009/3050)
- The Food for Particular Nutritional Uses (Addition of Substances for Specific Nutritional Purposes) (England) Regulations (SI 2009/3051)
- The City and County of Cardiff (Old St. Mellons, Rumney and Trowbridge Communities) Order (SI 2009/3052)
- The Finance Act 2009, Section 96 and Schedule 48 (Appointed Day, Savings and Consequential Amendments) Order (SI 2009/3054)
- The Registered Pension Schemes (Modification of the Rules of Existing Schemes) Regulations (SI 2009/3055)
- The Scottish and Northern Ireland Banknote Regulations (SI 2009/3056)
- The M1 Motorway (Junction 30 to Junction 31) and the M18 Motorway (Thurcroft Interchange) (Temporary Restriction and Prohibition of Traffic) Order (SI 2009/3057)
- The A20 Trunk Road (East of Roundhill Tunnel) (Temporary Prohibition of Traffic) Order (SI 2009/3058)
- The A38 Trunk Road (Linhay Junction, Ashburton) (Temporary Prohibition of Traffic) Order (SI 2009/3059)
- The A38 Trunk Road (Western Mill Junction to Tamar Roundabout, Plymouth) (Temporary Prohibition and Restriction of Traffic) Order (SI 2009/3060)
- The M60 Motorway (Junction 25) (Speed Limit) Regulations (SI 2009/3061)
- The Medicines (Exemptions and Miscellaneous Amendments) Order (SI 2009/3062)
- The Medicines for Human Use (Miscellaneous Amendments) (No.2) Regulations (SI 2009/3063)
- The Law Applicable to Contractual Obligations (England and Wales and Northern Ireland) Regulations (SI 2009/3064)
- The A30 Trunk Road (Whiddon Down, Near Okehampton) (Temporary Prohibition and Restriction of Traffic) Order (SI 2009/3065)
- The A259 Trunk Road (Various Roads, Rye) (Temporary Restriction and Prohibition of Traffic) Order (SI 2009/3066)
- The M55 Motorway (Junction 1–4, Westbound and Eastbound Carriageways and Slip Roads) (Temporary Prohibition and Restriction of Traffic) Order (SI 2009/3067)
- The Pensions Act 2004 (Code of Practice) (Trustee Knowledge and Understanding) Appointed Day Order (SI 2009/3068)
- The Ministry of Defence Police (Conduct) Regulations (SI 2009/3069)
- The Ministry of Defence Police Appeals Tribunals Regulations (SI 2009/3070)
- The Medicines (Pharmacies) (Applications for Registration and Fees) Amendment No. 2 Regulations (SI 2009/3071)
- The Child Maintenance and Other Payments Act 2008 (Commencement No. 6) Order (SI 2009/3072)
- The Taxes, etc. (Fees for Payment by Telephone) Regulations (SI 2009/3073)
- The Criminal Justice and Immigration Act 2008 (Commencement No.13 and Transitory Provision) Order (SI 2009/3074)
- The Financial Services and Markets Act 2000 (Law Applicable to Contracts of Insurance) Regulations (SI 2009/3075)
- The A12 and A120 Trunk Roads (Colchester, Essex) (Temporary Restriction and Prohibition of Traffic) Order (SI 2009/3076)
- The M6 Motorway (Junction 6) (Slip Roads) (Temporary Prohibition of Traffic) Order (SI 2009/3077)
- The M42 Motorway and the A42 Trunk Road (Junction 9 to Junction 11) (Temporary Restriction and Prohibition of Traffic)Order (SI 2009/3078)
- The M50 Motorway (Westbound Carriageway between Junctions 2 to 3) (Temporary Restriction and Prohibition of Traffic) Order (SI 2009/3079)
- The A5 Trunk Road (Mile End Roundabout to Five Crosses Roundabout, Shropshire) (Temporary Prohibition of Traffic) Order (SI 2009/3080)
- The Provision of Services (Insolvency Practitioners) Regulations (SI 2009/3081)
- The Prison and Young Offender Institution (Amendment) Rules (SI 2009/3082)
- The Specified Animal Pathogens (Amendment) Order (SI 2009/3083)
- The Political Parties and Elections Act 2009 (Commencement No.2 and Transitional Provisions) Order (SI 2009/3084)
- The North Staffordshire Hospital Centre National Health Service Trust (Establishment) Amendment Order (SI 2009/3085)
- The Royal Wolverhampton Hospitals National Health Service Trust (Establishment) Amendment Order (SI 2009/3086)
- The Local Democracy, Economic Development and Construction Act 2009 (Commencement No. 1) Order (SI 2009/3087)
- The Stamp Duty and Stamp Duty Reserve Tax (Investment Exchanges and Clearing Houses) (Over the Counter) Regulations (SI 2009/3088)
- The A500 Trunk Road (Near Hanchurch, Staffordshire) (Temporary Prohibition of Traffic in Laybys) Order (SI 2009/3089)
- The A5 Trunk Road (Montford Bridge to Edgebold, Shropshire) (Temporary Prohibition of Traffic) Order (SI 2009/3090)
- The A50 Trunk Road (Meir Tunnel, Staffordshire) (Temporary Prohibition of Traffic) Order (SI 2009/3091)
- The M40 Motorway (Junctions 15 – 16) (Temporary Restriction and Prohibition of Traffic) Order (SI 2009/3092)
- The Local Government Pension Scheme (Management and Investment of Funds) Regulations (SI 2009/3093)
- The Pensions Act 2007 (Supplementary Provisions) (No.2) Order (SI 2009/3094)
- The Non-Domestic Rating Contributions (England) (Amendment) Regulations (SI 2009/3095)
- The Policing and Crime Act 2009 (Commencement No. 1 and Transitional and Saving Provisions) Order (SI 2009/3096)
- The Welsh Health Specialised Services Committee (Wales) Regulations (SI 2009/3097)
- The Derelict Land Clearance Area (Drake Gardens, Tavistock) Order (SI 2009/3098)
- The M42 Motorway (Junction 1) (Slip Roads) (Temporary Prohibition of Traffic) Order (SI 2009/3099)
- The Utilities Contracts (Amendment) Regulations (SI 2009/3100)

== 3101–3200 ==
- The Private Water Supplies Regulations (SI 2009/3101)
- The Common Agricultural Policy Single Payment and Support Schemes Regulations (SI 2009/3102)
- The Road Vehicles (Registration and Licensing) (Amendment) (No. 2) Regulations (SI 2009/3103)
- The Water Resources Act 1991 (Amendment) (England and Wales) Regulations (SI 2009/3104)
- The Materials and Articles in Contact with Food (Wales) (Amendment) Regulations (SI 2009/3105)
- The M1 Motorway (Junction 20, Lutterworth) (Temporary Restriction and Prohibition of Traffic) Order (SI 2009/3106)
- The A1 Trunk Road (Southbound Carriageway between Ranby and Apleyhead Roundabout, Nottinghamshire) (Temporary Prohibition of Traffic) Order (SI 2009/3107)
- The A50 Trunk Road (A50/A38 Interchange, Derbyshire) (Slip Roads) (Temporary Prohibition of Traffic) Order (SI 2009/3108)
- The M1 Motorway and A38 Trunk Road (M1 Junction 28, Derbyshire) (Temporary Prohibition of Traffic) Order (SI 2009/3109)
- The A27 Trunk Road (Falmer Interchange, Slip Road) (Temporary Prohibition of Traffic) Order (SI 2009/3110)
- The Criminal Justice Act 2003 (Commencement No. 8 and Transitional and Saving Provisions) (Amendment No. 2) Order (SI 2009/3111)
- The Care Quality Commission (Registration) Regulations (SI 2009/3112)
- The Student Fees (Amounts) (England) (Amendment) Regulations (SI 2009/3113)
- The A1 Trunk Road (Felton to Deanmoor) (Temporary Restriction and Prohibition of Traffic) Order (SI 2009/3114)
- The A50 Trunk Road (Sawley Interchange, Leicestershire) (Westbound Entry Slip Road) (Temporary Prohibition of Traffic) Order (SI 2009/3115)
- The M27 Motorway (Junctions 11 and 12, Slip/Link Roads) (Temporary Prohibition of Traffic) Order (SI 2009/3116)
- The A47 Trunk Road (Soke Parkway to Eye Road, City of Peterborough) (60 Miles Per Hour Speed Limit) Order (SI 2009/3117)
- The A12 Trunk Road (Arley Grange Bridge, Stratford St Mary Bypass, Essex) Southbound Entry Slip Road (Temporary 40 Miles Per Hour Speed Restriction) Order (SI 2009/3118)
- The A12 and A120 Trunk Roads (Coggeshall to Marks Tey, Essex) (Temporary Restriction and Prohibition of Traffic) Order (SI 2009/3119)
- The A34 Trunk Road (Three Maids Hill) (Temporary Prohibition of Traffic) Order (SI 2009/3120)
- The A1 Trunk Road (Belford Junction to Detchant Lodge Junction) (Temporary Restriction and Prohibition of Traffic and Pedestrians) Order (SI 2009/3121)
- The A1 Trunk Road (Duns Road Junction to the Scottish Border) (Temporary Restriction and Prohibition of Traffic) Order (SI 2009/3122)
- The A1 Trunk Road (Birtley Interchange) (Temporary Prohibition of Traffic) Order (SI 2009/3123)
- The A30 Trunk Road (Tongue End Junction to Woodleigh Junction, Devon) (Temporary Prohibition of Traffic) Order (SI 2009/3124)
- The M18 Motorway (Junction 4 to Junction 3) (Temporary Restriction and Prohibition of Traffic) Order (SI 2009/3125)
- The A64 Trunk Road (Hopgrove Roundabout to Barton Hill) (Temporary Restriction and Prohibition of Traffic) Order (SI 2009/3126)
- The Value Added Tax (Supplementary Charge) Order (SI 2009/3127)
- The Financial Services and Markets Act 2000 (Market Abuse) Regulations (SI 2009/3128)
- The Common Agricultural Policy Single Payment and Support Schemes (Wales) (Amendment) Regulations (SI 2009/3129)
- The Greenhouse Gas Emissions Data and National Implementation Measures Regulations (SI 2009/3130)
- The Civil Jurisdiction and Judgments Regulations (SI 2009/3131)
- The Misuse of Drugs (Designation) (Amendment) (England, Wales and Scotland) Order (SI 2009/3135)
- The Misuse of Drugs (Amendment) (England, Wales and Scotland) Regulations (SI 2009/3136)
- The M4, A404(M) and A308(M) Motorways (M4 Junction 8/9) (Temporary Prohibition of Traffic) Order (SI 2009/3137)
- The M3 Motorway (Junctions 3 – 2) (Temporary Restriction and Prohibition of Traffic) Order (SI 2009/3138)
- The Offshore Funds (Tax) (Amendment) Regulations (SI 2009/3139)
- The Plant Health (Import Inspection Fees) (Wales) (Amendment) (No.2) Regulations (SI 2009/3140)
- The Traffic Management (London Borough of Barnet) Permit Scheme Order (SI 2009/3141)
- The Traffic Management (London Borough of Brent) Permit Scheme Order (SI 2009/3142)
- The European Union (Amendment) Act 2008 (Commencement No.1) Order (SI 2009/3143)
- The Bolton Metropolitan Borough Council (School Meals) Order (SI 2009/3144)
- The Volatile Organic Compounds in Paints, Varnishes and Vehicle Refinishing Products (Amendment) (England) Regulations (SI 2009/3145)
- The Carbon Accounting (Amendment) Regulations (SI 2009/3146)
- The Non-Domestic Rating Contributions (Wales) (Amendment) Regulations (SI 2009/3147)
- The Traffic Management (London Borough of Bromley) Permit Scheme Order (SI 2009/3148)
- The Traffic Management (London Borough of Camden) Permit Scheme Order (SI 2009/3149)
- The Local Government Pension Scheme (Miscellaneous) Regulations (SI 2009/3150)
- The Child Support (Management of Payments and Arrears) Regulations (SI 2009/3151)
- The Income Support (Prescribed Categories of Person) Regulations (SI 2009/3152)
- The Thurrock and Basildon College (Dissolution) Order (SI 2009/3153)
- The Parliamentary Pensions (Amendment) (No 2) Regulations (SI 2009/3154)
- The Accreditation Regulations (SI 2009/3155)
- The Education (School Teachers' Qualifications) (England) (Amendment) Regulations (SI 2009/3156)
- The INSPIRE Regulations (SI 2009/3157)
- The Traffic Management (London Borough of Croydon) Permit Scheme Order (SI 2009/3158)
- The Licensing Act 2003 (Premises licences and club premises certificates) (Amendment) (Electronic Applications etc.) Regulations (SI 2009/3159)
- The Nitrate Pollution Prevention (Amendment) Regulations (SI 2009/3160)
- The Staffing of Maintained Schools (Wales) (Amendment No. 2) Regulations (SI 2009/3161)
- The Traffic Management (City of London Corporation) Permit Scheme Order (SI 2009/3162)
- The Traffic Management (London Borough of Ealing) Permit Scheme Order (SI 2009/3163)
- The Customs (Contravention of a Relevant Rule) (Amendment) Regulations (SI 2009/3164)
- The Traffic Management (London Borough of Enfield) Permit Scheme Order (SI 2009/3165)
- The Value Added Tax (Tour Operators) (Amendment) Order (SI 2009/3166)
- The Traffic Management (London Borough of Hackney) Permit Scheme Order (SI 2009/3167)
- The Traffic Management (London Borough of Hammersmith and Fulham) Permit Scheme Order (SI 2009/3168)
- The Traffic Management (London Borough of Haringey) Permit Scheme Order (SI 2009/3169)
- The Traffic Management (Royal Borough of Kensington and Chelsea) Permit Scheme Order (SI 2009/3170)
- The Traffic Management (London Borough of Lewisham) Permit Scheme Order (SI 2009/3171)
- The Travellers' Allowances (Amendment) Order (SI 2009/3172)
- The Corporation Tax (Financing Costs and Income) Regulations (SI 2009/3173)
- The Learning and Skills (Wales) Measure 2009 (Commencement No. 1 and Transitional Provision) Order (SI 2009/3174)
- The Non-Domestic Rating (Small Business Rate Relief) (England) (Amendment) (No.2) Order (SI 2009/3175)
- The Non-Domestic Rating (Rural Settlements) (England) (Amendment) Order (SI 2009/3176)
- The Non-Domestic Rating (Stud Farms) (England) Order (SI 2009/3177)
- The Traffic Management (London Borough of Hounslow) Permit Scheme Order (SI 2009/3178)
- The Traffic Management (London Borough of Redbridge) Permit Scheme Order (SI 2009/3179)
- The Traffic Management (London Borough of Islington) Permit Scheme Order (SI 2009/3180)
- The M4 Motorway (Junction 10, Link Roads) (Temporary Prohibition of Traffic) (No. 3) Order (SI 2009/3181)
- The Companies Act 2006 (Substitution of Section 1201) Regulations (SI 2009/3182)
- The M27 Motorway (Junction 5, Westbound Exit Slip Road) (Temporary Restriction and Prohibition of Traffic) Order (SI 2009/3183)
- The Courts Boards Areas (Amendment) Order (SI 2009/3184)
- The A1 Trunk Road (A1(M) Junction 10 to Taylors Road, Astwick, Bedfordshire) (Temporary Restriction and Prohibition of Traffic) Order (SI 2009/3185)
- The Traffic Management (Transport for London) Permit Scheme Order (SI 2009/3186)
- The Traffic Management (City of Westminster) Permit Scheme Order (SI 2009/3187)
- The Traffic Management (Kent County Council) Permit Scheme Order (SI 2009/3188)
- The Traffic Management (London Borough of Wandsworth) Permit Scheme Order (SI 2009/3189)
- The Gas (Applications for Licences and Extensions and Restrictions of Licences) Regulations (SI 2009/3190)
- The Electricity (Applications for Licences, Modifications of an Area and Extensions and Restrictions of Licences) Regulations (SI 2009/3191)
- THE LONDON TO FISHGUARD TRUNK ROAD (A40) (IMPROVEMENT AT THE KELL, TREFFGARNE) ORDER (SI 2009/3192)
- The Council Tax (Demand Notices) (England) Regulations (SI 2009/3193)
- The A14 Trunk Road (Claydon Interchange Junction 52 to Creeting St. Mary, Suffolk) (Temporary Restriction and Prohibition of Traffic) Order (SI 2009/3194)
- The A1(M) Motorway (Junction 57, Blackwell Spur) (Temporary 50 Miles Per Hour Speed Restriction) Order (SI 2009/3195)
- The A1 Trunk Road (Swalwell Interchange) (Temporary Prohibition of Traffic) Order (SI 2009/3196)
- The M61 Motorway (Junction 6 Southbound Dedicated Exit Slip Road) (Temporary Prohibition of Traffic) Order (SI 2009/3197)
- The M5 Motorway (Junctions 15–17) (Temporary Prohibition and Restriction of Traffic) Order (SI 2009/3198)
- The M1, M6 and M45 Motorways (M1 Junctions 14 to 20) (Temporary Restriction and Prohibition of Traffic) Order (SI 2009/3199)
- The General Teaching Council (Registration of Temporary Teachers from Relevant European States) (England and Wales) Regulations (SI 2009/3200)

== 3201–3300 ==
- The Statistics and Registration Service Act 2007 (Disclosure of Higher Education Student Information) Regulations (SI 2009/3201)
- The Education (Inspectors of Education and Training in Wales) Order (SI 2009/3202)
- The Nuclear Material (Offences) Act 1983 (Isle of Man) Order (SI 2009/3203)
- The St Helena Court of Appeal (Appeal to Privy Council) (Amendment) Order (SI 2009/3204)
- The Falkland Islands (Appeals to Privy Council) (Amendment) Order (SI 2009/3205)
- The Cayman Islands (Appeals to Privy Council) (Amendment) Order (SI 2009/3206)
- The Gibraltar (Appeals to Privy Council) (Amendment) Order (SI 2009/3207)
- The Chief Regulator of Qualifications and Examinations Order (SI 2009/3208)
- The Misuse of Drugs Act 1971 (Amendment) Order (SI 2009/3209)
- The Census (England and Wales) Order (SI 2009/3210)
- The European Communities (Definition of Treaties) (Stabilisation and Association Agreement) (Republic of Montenegro) Order (SI 2009/3211)
- The Export of Goods, Transfer of Technology and Provision of Technical Assistance (Control) (Overseas Territories) (Amendment) Order (SI 2009/3212)
- The North Korea (United Nations Sanctions) (Amendment) Order (SI 2009/3213)
- The European Communities (Designation) (No. 5) Order (SI 2009/3214)
- The Police Act 1997 (Criminal Records) (Guernsey) Order (SI 2009/3215)
- The Waste Electrical and Electronic Equipment (Amendment) (No.2) Regulations (SI 2009/3216)
- The Corporation Tax (Tax Treatment of Financing Costs and Income) (Acceptable Financial Statements) Regulations (SI 2009/3217)
- The Income and Corporation Taxes (Electronic Communications) (Amendment) Regulations (SI 2009/3218)
- The Sheep and Goats (Records, Identification and Movement) (England) Order (SI 2009/3219)
- The Road Vehicles Lighting and Goods Vehicles (Plating and Testing) (Amendment) Regulations (SI 2009/3220)
- The Road Vehicles (Construction and Use)(Amendment)(No.4) Regulations (SI 2009/3221)
- The Medicines (Products for Human Use) (Amendments to Fees for Variations) Regulations (SI 2009/3222)
- The Employment Protection Code of Practice (Time Off for Trade Union Duties and Activities) Order (SI 2009/3223)
- The Smoke Control Areas (Exempted Fireplaces) (Wales) Order (SI 2009/3224)
- The Smoke Control Areas (Authorised Fuels) (Wales) (Amendment) Regulations (SI 2009/3225)
- The Northern Rock plc Transfer Order (SI 2009/3226)
- The Northern Rock plc (Tax Consequences) Regulations (SI 2009/3227)
- The Social Security (Miscellaneous Amendments) (No. 5) Regulations (SI 2009/3228)
- The Social Security (Miscellaneous Amendments) (No. 6) Regulations (SI 2009/3229)
- The Food (Jelly Mini-Cups) (Emergency Control) (England) Regulations (SI 2009/3230)
- The Price Marking (Amendment) Order (SI 2009/3231)
- The Agricultural Holdings (Units of Production) (Wales) Order (SI 2009/3232)
- The Legal Services Act 2007 (Approved Regulators) Order (SI 2009/3233)
- The Specified Animal Pathogens (Wales) (Amendment) Order (SI 2009/3234)
- The Food Enzymes Regulations (SI 2009/3235)
- The Armed Forces and Reserve Forces (Compensation Scheme) (Amendment) Order (SI 2009/3236)
- The Yorkshire Coast College of Further and Higher Education, Scarborough (Dissolution) Order (SI 2009/3237)
- The Food Additives (England) Regulations (SI 2009/3238)
- The Braintree College (Dissolution) Order (SI 2009/3239)
- The M5 Motorway (Junction 2) (Slip Road) (Temporary Prohibition of Traffic) Order (SI 2009/3240)
- The Value Added Tax (Amendment) (No. 5) Regulations (SI 2009/3241)
- The Local Transport Act 2008 (Commencement No. 2 and Transitional Provision) Order (SI 2009/3242)
- The Quality Contracts Schemes (QCS Boards) (England) Regulations (SI 2009/3243)
- The Quality Contracts Schemes (Tendering Requirements) (England) Regulations (SI 2009/3244)
- The Public Service Vehicles (Registration of Local Services) (Quality Contracts Schemes) (England and Wales) Regulations (SI 2009/3245)
- The Quality Contracts Schemes (Application of TUPE) Regulations (SI 2009/3246)
- The Quality Contracts Schemes (Pension Protection) Regulations (SI 2009/3247)
- The Quality Partnership Schemes (England) (Amendment) Regulations (SI 2009/3248)
- The Legal Services Act 2007 (Maximum Penalty for Approved Regulators) Rules (SI 2009/3249)
- The Legal Services Act 2007 (Commencement No. 6, Transitory, Transitional and Saving Provisions) Order (SI 2009/3250)
- The Food Supplements (England) and Addition of Vitamins, Minerals and Other Substances (England) (Amendment) Regulations (SI 2009/3251)
- The Food Supplements (Wales) and Addition of Vitamins, Minerals and Other Substances (Wales) (Amendment) Regulations (SI 2009/3252)
- The Coroners and Justice Act 2009 (Commencement No. 1 and Transitional Provisions) Order (SI 2009/3253)
- The Food for Particular Nutritional Uses (Addition of Substances for Specific Nutritional Purposes) (Wales) Regulations (SI 2009/3254)
- The Official Feed and Food Controls (England) Regulations (SI 2009/3255)
- The Education (Local Curriculum for Pupils in Key Stage 4) (Wales) Regulations (SI 2009/3256)
- The Social Security (Housing Costs Special Arrangements) (Amendment) Regulations (SI 2009/3257)
- The Private and Voluntary Health Care (Wales) (Amendment) Regulations (SI 2009/3258)
- The Public Lending Right Scheme 1982 (Commencement of Variation) Order (SI 2009/3259)
- The M6 Motorway (Junction 6) (Slip Roads) (Temporary Prohibition of Traffic) (No 2) Order (SI 2009/3260)
- The M42 Motorway (Junction 4, Solihull) (Temporary Prohibition of Traffic) Order (SI 2009/3261)
- The A45, the A446 and the A452 Trunk Roads (Stonebridge to M6 Junction 4) (Temporary Restriction and Prohibition of Traffic) Order (SI 2009/3262)
- The Common Agricultural Policy Single Payment and Support Schemes (Integrated Administration and Control System) Regulations (SI 2009/3263)
- The Agriculture (Cross compliance) Regulations (SI 2009/3264)
- The Children Act 1989 (Amendment of Miscellaneous Regulations) (No. 2) (Wales) Regulations (SI 2009/3265)
- The Motor Cycles Etc. and Tractors Etc. (EC Type Approval) (Amendment) Regulations (SI 2009/3266)
- The Occupational Pensions (Revaluation) Order (SI 2009/3267)
- The Child Benefit and Guardian's Allowance (Miscellaneous Amendments) Regulations (SI 2009/3268)
- The International Joint Investigation Teams (International Agreement) Order (SI 2009/3269)
- The Rural Development Programmes (Wales) (Amendment) Regulations (SI 2009/3270)
- The Control of Salmonella in Turkey Flocks Order (SI 2009/3271)
- The Local Government (Wales) Measure 2009 (Commencement No. 2, Transitional Provisions and Savings) Order (SI 2009/3272)
- The Designation of Schools having a Religious Character (England) Order (SI 2009/3273)
- The Employment Rights (Revision of Limits) Order (SI 2009/3274)
- The Environmental Damage (Prevention and Remediation) (Amendment) Regulations (SI 2009/3275)
- The Designation of Schools Having a Religious Character (Independent Schools) (England) (No. 3) Order (SI 2009/3276)
- The Biofuel (Labelling) (Amendment) Regulations (SI 2009/3277)
- The A38 Trunk Road (Findern to Weeford) (Temporary Restriction and Prohibition of Traffic) (No. 2) Order (SI 2009/3278)
- The A14 Trunk Road (Westbound Carriageway between Portly Ford Bridge and M1 Junction 19) (Temporary Prohibition of Traffic) Order (SI 2009/3279)
- The A38 Trunk Road (Monk's Bridge Layby, Near Clay Mills, Burton On Trent) (Temporary Prohibition of Traffic) Order (SI 2009/3280)
- South Devon Railway Order 2009 (SI 2009/3281)
- The A45 Trunk Road (Ryton-on-Dunsmore, Warwickshire) (Temporary Prohibition of Traffic) Order (SI 2009/3282)
- The Petroleum Licensing (Amendment) Regulations (SI 2009/3283)
- The Woodbury Common Range Byelaws (SI 2009/3284)
- The A49 Trunk Road (Kimbolton to Leominster) (Temporary Restriction and Prohibition of Traffic) Order (SI 2009/3285)
- The M5 Motorway and A4123 Link Road (M5 Junction 2, Oldbury) (Temporary Prohibition of Traffic) Order (SI 2009/3287)
- The A1(M) Motorway (Junction 64, Washington to Junction 63, Blind Lane) and the A167 Trunk Road (Blind Lane Roundabout) (Temporary Restriction and Prohibition of Traffic) Order (SI 2009/3288)
- The A3 Trunk Road (Griggs Green Interchange, Slip Roads) (Temporary Prohibition of Traffic) Order (SI 2009/3289)
- The M3 Motorway (Junctions 13 and 14, Slip/Link Roads) (Temporary Prohibition of Traffic) Order (SI 2009/3290)
- The M20 Motorway and the A20 Trunk Road (Roundhill Tunnels) (Temporary Restriction and Prohibition of Traffic) Order (SI 2009/3291)
- The M1 Motorway (Junction 2, Slip Roads) (Temporary 30 Miles Per Hour Speed Restriction) Order (SI 2009/3292)
- The Quality Partnership Schemes (Wales) Regulations (SI 2009/3293)
- The Local Transport Act 2008 (Commencement No. 2) (Wales) Order (SI 2009/3294)
- The A2 Trunk Road (Near Upper Harbledown, Coastbound Exit Slip Road) (Temporary Prohibition of Traffic) Order (SI 2009/3295)
- The A14 Trunk Road (Rusts Lane, Alconbury, Cambridgeshire) Northbound Exit Slip Road (Temporary Prohibition of Traffic) Order (SI 2009/3296)
- The Police Act 1997 (Criminal Records and Registration) (Guernsey) Regulations (SI 2009/3297)
- The Civil Enforcement of Parking Contraventions (County of Oxfordshire) (District of West Oxfordshire) Designation Order (SI 2009/3298)
- The A1 Trunk Road (Cock Hill to Fairmoor Interchange) (Temporary 50 Miles Per Hour Speed Restriction) Order (SI 2009/3299)
- The A66 Trunk Road (Little Burdon to Longnewton) (Prohibition of Use of Gaps in the Central Reservation) Order (SI 2009/3300)

== 3301–3400 ==
- The A1 Trunk Road and The A1(M) (Blyth, Nottinghamshire) (Temporary Restriction and Prohibition of Traffic) Order (SI 2009/3301)
- The A1 Trunk Road (Brockdam Farm to Adderstone Grange Junction) (Temporary Restriction and Prohibition of Traffic) Order (SI 2009/3302)
- The A120 Trunk Road (Coggeshall Road/Marks Farm Roundabout to East of Kings Lane, Braintree, Essex) (Temporary Restriction and Prohibition of Traffic) Order (SI 2009/3303)
- The A50 Trunk Road (Chellaston Interchange) (Slip Roads) (Temporary Prohibition of Traffic) Order (SI 2009/3304)
- The M5 Motorway (Junctions 17–18) (Temporary Prohibition and Restriction of Traffic) Order (SI 2009/3305)
- The A38 Trunk Road (Streethay, Staffordshire) (Temporary Prohibition of Traffic) Order (SI 2009/3306)
- The Blood Safety and Quality (Modification) Regulations (SI 2009/3307)
- The A46 Trunk Road (Widmerpool to Saxondale, Nottinghamshire) (Temporary Prohibition of Traffic) Order (SI 2009/3308)
- The A3 Trunk Road (Hindhead – Liphook) (Temporary Restriction and Prohibition of Traffic) (No. 2) Order (SI 2009/3309)
- The A2070 Trunk Road (A2042 Junction, Slip Roads) (Temporary Prohibition of Traffic) Order (SI 2009/3310)
- The A2 Trunk Road (Upper Harbledown – Whitfield, Slip Roads) (Temporary Prohibition of Traffic) Order (SI 2009/3311)
- The Community Legal Service (Financial) (Amendment No. 3) Regulations (SI 2009/3312)
- The Corporation Tax (Exclusion from Short-Term Loan Relationships) Regulations (SI 2009/3313)
- The Distributions (Excluded Companies) Regulations (SI 2009/3314)
- The Real Estate Investment Trusts (Prescribed Arrangements) Regulations (SI 2009/3315)
- Education and Skills Act 2008 (Commencement No. 5) Order 2009 (SI 2009/3316)
- Apprenticeships, Skills, Children and Learning Act 2009 (Commencement No. 1 and Saving Provision) Order 2009 (SI 2009/3317)
- Local Democracy, Economic Development and Construction Act 2009 (Commencement No. 2) Order 2009 (SI 2009/3318)
- The Allocation and Transfer of Proceedings (Amendment) Order (SI 2009/3319)
- The Civil Courts (Amendment No. 2) Order (SI 2009/3320)
- The Immigration (Biometric Registration) (Amendment No. 2) Regulations (SI 2009/3321)
- The Accounts and Audit (Amendment No. 2) (England) Regulations (SI 2009/3322)
- Identity Cards Act 2006 (Commencement No. 6) Order 2009 (SI 2009/3323)
- The M27 Motorway (Junctions 11 – 12) (Temporary Prohibition of Traffic) Order (SI 2009/3324)
- The A590 Trunk Road (Newland Resurfacing) (Temporary Prohibition and Restriction of Traffic) Order (SI 2009/3325)
- The M3 Motorway (Junction 4, Slip Roads) (Temporary Prohibition of Traffic) Order (SI 2009/3326)
- The A12 Trunk Road (South of Colemans Interchange, Junction 22 to South of Hatfield Peverel Interchange, Junction 20a, Braintree, Essex) (Temporary Restriction and Prohibition of Traffic) Variation Order (SI 2009/3327)
- The Criminal Defence Service (Contribution Orders) Regulations (SI 2009/3328)
- The Criminal Defence Service (Representation Orders: Appeals etc.) (Amendment) Regulations (SI 2009/3329)
- The M6 Motorway (Junction 19, Northbound and Southbound Entry Slip Roads) (Temporary Prohibition of Traffic) Order (SI 2009/3330)
- The Criminal Defence Service (Representation Orders) (Amendment) Regulations (SI 2009/3331)
- Saving Gateway Accounts Act 2009 (Commencement No. 1) Order 2009 (SI 2009/3332)
- The Tax Credits (Excluded Companies) Regulations (SI 2009/3333)
- Police Act 1997 (Criminal Records) (Disclosure) (Amendment No. 3) Regulations (Northern Ireland) 2009 (SI 2009/3334)
- The Railways (East London Railway Services) Exemption Order (SI 2009/3335)
- The Railways (Transport for London) (Exemptions) Order (SI 2009/3336)
- The School Support Staff Negotiating Body (Prescribed Organisations) Regulations (SI 2009/3337)
- The Climate Change Levy (Solid Fuel) (Revocation) Regulations (SI 2009/3338)
- Legal Services Act 2007 (Functions of an Approved Regulator) Order 2009 (SI 2009/3339)
- The National Health Service (Pharmaceutical Services) (Appliances) (Amendment) Regulations (SI 2009/3340)
- Apprenticeships, Skills, Children and Learning Act 2009 (Commencement No. 1) (Wales) Order 2009 (SI 2009/3341)
- The Town and Country Planning (Environmental Impact Assessment) (Undetermined Reviews of Old Mineral Permissions) (Wales) Regulations (SI 2009/3342)
- The Non-Domestic Rating (Chargeable Amounts) (England) Regulations (SI 2009/3343)
- The Eels (England and Wales) Regulations (SI 2009/3344)
- Marine and Coastal Access Act 2009 (Commencement No. 1 and Transitional Provisions) Order 2009 (SI 2009/3345)
- The Designation of Rural Primary Schools (England) Order (SI 2009/3346)
- The City of New Sarum (Churchill Way Pedestrian Underpasses) (Prohibition of Cycling) Order 1972 (Variation) Order (SI 2009/3347)
- Legal Services Act 2007 (Consequential Amendments) Order 2009 (SI 2009/3348)
- The A595 Trunk Road (West Lakes to Captain's House Junction, Bigrigg) (Temporary Prohibition and Restriction of Traffic) Order (SI 2009/3349)
- The London – Penzance Trunk Road (A38) (Dobwalls to Trerulefoot Roundabout) (Prohibition of Waiting) (Clearways) Order 1978 (Variation) Order (SI 2009/3350)
- The M6 Motorway (Junctions 32-34, Northbound and Southbound Carriageways, Junction 33 Northbound and Southbound Slip Roads and Forton Service Area) (Temporary Prohibition and Restriction of Traffic) Order (SI 2009/3351)
- The Criminal Defence Service (Recovery of Defence Costs Orders) (Amendment) Regulations (SI 2009/3352)
- The M6 Motorway (Junction 42–44, Northbound and Southbound Carriageways and Junction 43 Northbound Entry and Southbound Exit Slip Roads) (Temporary Prohibition and Restriction of Traffic) Order (SI 2009/3353)
- Children and Young Persons Act 2008 (Commencement No. 2) Order 2009 (SI 2009/3354)
- The Education (Information About Children in Alternative Provision) (Wales) Regulations (SI 2009/3355)
- The A55 Trunk Road (Junctions with A56 and A51 and Westbound and Eastbound Slip Roads) and the M53 Motorway (Temporary Prohibition of Traffic) Order (SI 2009/3356)
- The A627(M) Motorway (Junction 2, Slattocks Roundabout, Southbound Exit Slip Road and the Westbound and Eastbound Link Roads to and from the A664) (Temporary Prohibition of Traffic) Order (SI 2009/3357)
- The Severn Bridges Toll Order (SI 2009/3358)
- The Assembly Learning Grants (European University Institute) (Wales) Regulations (SI 2009/3359)
- The M65 Motorway (Junctions 6–7, Eastbound and Westbound Carriageways and Slip Roads) (Temporary Prohibition and Restriction of Traffic) Order (SI 2009/3360)
- The Crown Court (Amendment) Rules (SI 2009/3361)
- The Magistrates' Courts (Amendment) Rules (SI 2009/3362)
- The British Nationality (General) (Amendment) Regulations (SI 2009/3363)
- The Sheep and Goats (Records, Identification and Movement) (Wales) Order (SI 2009/3364)
- The Agriculture (Cross compliance) (No. 2) Regulations (SI 2009/3365)
- The Cosmetic Products (Safety) (Amendment No. 4) Regulations (SI 2009/3367)
- The M62 Motorway (Junction 7, Westbound Exit Slip Road) (Temporary Prohibition of Traffic) Order (SI 2009/3368)
- The M53 Motorway (Junction 7 Southbound Entry Slip Road and Junction 9 Northbound Entry Slip Road) (Temporary Prohibition of Traffic) Order (SI 2009/3369)
- The A34 Trunk Road (North of Kidlington, Layby) (Temporary Prohibition of Traffic) Order (SI 2009/3370)
- The A34 Trunk Road (South Hinksey, Carriageways) (Temporary Speed Restrictions) Order (SI 2009/3371)
- The M4 Motorway (Junctions 8/9 – 10) (Temporary Restriction and Prohibition of Traffic) Order (SI 2009/3372)
- The A2 Trunk Road (Barham – Bridge) (Temporary Restriction and Prohibition of Traffic) Order (SI 2009/3373)
- The M25 Motorway and the A282 Trunk Road (Dartford – Thurrock Crossing) (Temporary Restriction and Prohibition of Traffic) Order (SI 2009/3374)
- The Cardiff to Glan Conwy Trunk Road (A470) (Cwm-bach to Newbridge-on-Wye) Order (SI 2009/3375)
- The Official Feed and Food Controls (Wales) Regulations (SI 2009/3376)
- The Food Enzymes (Wales) Regulations (SI 2009/3377)
- The Food Additives (Wales) Regulations (SI 2009/3378)
- The Food (Jelly Mini-Cups) (Emergency Control) (Wales) Regulations (SI 2009/3379)
- Protection of Military Remains Act 1986 (Designation of Vessels and Controlled Sites) Order 2009 (SI 2009/3380)
- The Environmental Permitting (England and Wales) (Amendment) (No. 2) Regulations (SI 2009/3381)
- The Berwick upon Tweed (Closure of Spittal Quay) Harbour Revision Order (SI 2009/3382)
- The A20 Trunk Road (Petham Court, Layby) (Temporary Prohibition of Traffic) Order (SI 2009/3383)
- The A34 Trunk Road (East Ilsley, Southbound Slip Road) (Temporary Prohibition of Traffic) Order (SI 2009/3384)
- The M25 Motorway (Junctions 9 – 10) (Temporary Restriction and Prohibition of Traffic) Order (SI 2009/3385)
- The A27 and A26 Trunk Roads (Southerham – Beddingham) (Temporary Restriction and Prohibition of Traffic) Order 2006 Revocation Order (SI 2009/3386)
- The A23 Trunk Road (Warninglid Interchange – Hickstead Interchange, Slip Roads) (Temporary Prohibition of Traffic) (No. 2) Order (SI 2009/3387)
- The A20 Trunk Road (Alkham Valley Interchange and Courtwood Interchange, Slip Roads) (Temporary Prohibition of Traffic) (No. 2) Order (SI 2009/3388)
- The Housing Benefit and Council Tax Benefit (War Pension Disregards) (Amendment) Regulations (SI 2009/3389)
- The Civil Procedure (Amendment No. 2) Rules (SI 2009/3390)
- The Sea Fishing (Illegal, Unreported and Unregulated Fishing) Order (SI 2009/3391)
- The A23 Trunk Road and the A27 Trunk Road (Patcham Junction, Link Roads) (Temporary Prohibition of Traffic) (No. 2) Order (SI 2009/3392)
- The A3 Trunk Road (Milford – Shackleford) (Temporary Speed Restrictions) Order (SI 2009/3393)
- The M27 Motorway (Junctions 7 – 9) (Temporary Restriction of Traffic) Order (SI 2009/3394)
- The M6 Motorway (Southwaite Services Northbound Entry and Exit Slip Roads) (Temporary Prohibition of Traffic) Order (SI 2009/3395)
- The M60 Motorway (Junction 25, Clockwise Exit Slip Road) (Temporary Prohibition of Traffic) No. 2 Order (SI 2009/3396)
- The M67 Motorway (Junction 1A, Dedicated Left Turn Filter Lane) (Temporary Prohibition of Traffic) Order (SI 2009/3397)
- The A46 Trunk Road (Kirby Muxloe, Leicestershire) (Temporary Prohibition of Traffic) Order (SI 2009/3398)
- The M42 Motorway (Junction 5 – Junction 6) (Temporary Prohibition of Traffic) Order (SI 2009/3399)
- The M6 Motorway (Junction 6) (Slip Roads) (Temporary Prohibition of Traffic) (No. 3) Order (SI 2009/3400)

== 3401–3500 ==
- The A45 Trunk Road (Between Raunds and Thrapston, Northamptonshire) (Temporary Prohibition of Traffic) Order (SI 2009/3401)
- The A500 Trunk Road (Stoke-on-Trent, Staffordshire) (Temporary Prohibition of Traffic) Order (SI 2009/3402)
- The Regulation of Investigatory Powers (Authorisations Extending to Scotland) (Amendment) Order (SI 2009/3403)
- The Regulation of Investigatory Powers (Covert Human Intelligence Sources: Matters Subject to Legal Privilege) Order (SI 2009/3404)
- The Surrey County Council (New Thames Road Bridge, Walton) Scheme 2008 Confirmation Instrument (SI 2009/3405)
- The Air Navigation (Restriction of Flying) [Bushey] Regulations 2009 (SI 2009/3406)
- The A47 Trunk Road (Pullover Road, Tilney All Saints and Lynn Road, North Runcton, King's Lynn, Norfolk) (Temporary Restriction and Prohibition of Traffic) Order (SI 2009/3407)
- The A12 Trunk Road (Brentwood, Essex to Ipswich, Suffolk) Various Laybys (Temporary Prohibition of Traffic) Order (SI 2009/3408)
- The A11 Trunk Road (Mill Road Junction to A14 Junction 36, Bottisham, Cambridgeshire) (Temporary Restriction and Prohibition of Traffic) Order (SI 2009/3411)
- The A47 Trunk Road (Blofield Bypass, Cucumber Lane Roundabout, Brundall, Norfolk) (Temporary Restriction and Prohibition of Traffic) Order (SI 2009/3412)
- The A5 Trunk Road (Beech Road, Dunstable, Bedfordshire to M1 Motorway Junction 9, Hertfordshire) (Temporary Restriction and Prohibition of Traffic) Order (SI 2009/3413)
- The M11 Motorway (Junction 9 to Junction 12, Cambridgeshire) (Temporary Restriction and Prohibition of Traffic) Order (SI 2009/3414)
- The A1 Trunk Road (Oxford Junction to Heatherytops) (Temporary Restriction and Prohibition of Traffic) Order (SI 2009/3415)
- The A19 Trunk Road and the A174 Trunk Road (Parkway Interchange) (Temporary Restriction and Prohibition of Traffic) Order (SI 2009/3416)
- The A14 Trunk Road (Beacon Hill Interchange to Copdock Interchange, Ipswich Western Bypass) and A12 Trunk Road (Ipswich, Suffolk) (Temporary Restriction and Prohibition of Traffic) Order (SI 2009/3417)
- The A184 Trunk Road and the A194(M) Motorway (White Mare Pool Interchange) (Temporary Restriction and Prohibition of Traffic and Pedestrians) Order (SI 2009/3418)
- The A1(M) Motorway (Junction 36) and Barrel Lane Pedestrian Footbridge (Warmsworth) (Temporary Prohibition and Restriction of Traffic and Pedestrians) Order (SI 2009/3419)
- The A27 Trunk Road (Gainsborough Lane) (Temporary Restriction and Prohibition of Traffic) Order (SI 2009/3421)
- The A36 Trunk Road (Standerwick to Black Dog Hill, Wiltshire) (Temporary Prohibition of Traffic) Order (SI 2009/3422)
- The A3 Trunk Road (Esher – Ockham) (Temporary Prohibition of Traffic) Order (SI 2009/3423)
- The M25 Motorway (Bell Common Tunnel) (Temporary Restriction and Prohibition of Traffic) Order (SI 2009/3424)
- The A1, A421 and A428 Trunk Roads (South of Black Cat Roundabout, Bedfordshire to Eaton Socon, Cambridgeshire) (Temporary Restriction and Prohibition of Traffic) Order (SI 2009/3425)
- The A47 Trunk Road (Lynn Road, Swaffham, Norfolk) (Temporary Restriction and Prohibition of Traffic) Order (SI 2009/3426)
- The M60 Motorway (Junction 1, Anticlockwise Exit Slip Road) (Temporary Prohibition of Traffic) (No. 2) Order (SI 2009/3427)
- The A47 Trunk Road (C429 Cucumber Lane Roundabout, Brundall to C441 Blofield Junction, Norfolk) (Temporary Restriction and Prohibition of Traffic) Order (SI 2009/3428)
- The A421 Trunk Road (M1 Junction 13 to Bedford) (Temporary Restriction and Prohibition of Traffic) Order (SI 2009/3429)
- The M60 Motorway (Junction 25, Anticlockwise Exit Slip Road) (Temporary Prohibition of Traffic) (No 2) Order (SI 2009/3430)
- The M53 Motorway (Junctions 5–6 Northbound and Southbound Carriageways and Junction 5 Southbound and Junction 6 Northbound Entry Slip Roads) (Temporary Prohibition of Traffic) Order (SI 2009/3431)
- The A38 Trunk Road (Belvedere Cross to the Wobbly Wheel Junction, Near Exeter) (Temporary Prohibition and Restriction of Traffic) Order (SI 2009/3432)
- The A30 Trunk Road (Tolvaddon Junction, Camborne) (Temporary Prohibition and Restriction of Traffic) Order (SI 2009/3433)
- The A303 Trunk Road (Chicklade to A350 Furze Hedge Junction, Wiltshire) (Temporary Restriction of Traffic) Order (SI 2009/3434)
- The A56 Trunk Road (Layby Closures) (Temporary Prohibition of Traffic) Order (SI 2009/3435)
- The M5 Motorway (Junction 12) (Temporary Prohibition and Restriction of Traffic) Order 2009 Variation Order (SI 2009/3436)
- The M4 Motorway (Second Severn Crossing) (Temporary Restriction of Traffic) Order (SI 2009/3437)
- The M4 Motorway (Junctions 16–17) (Temporary Prohibition and Restriction of Traffic) Order (SI 2009/3438)
- The M621 Motorway (Junction 4, Hunslet) (Temporary Prohibition of Traffic) Order (SI 2009/3439)
- The A1(M) Motorway (Junction 63 to Junction 64) (Temporary 50 Miles Per Hour Speed Restriction) Order (SI 2009/3440)
- The A628/A616 Trunk Roads (Hollingworth to Westwood Roundabout) (Temporary Prohibition of Traffic) Order (SI 2009/3441)
- The A19 Trunk Road and the A66 Trunk Road (Stockton Road Interchange to Portrack Interchange) (Temporary Prohibition of Traffic) (No.2) Order (SI 2009/3442)
- The A1 Trunk Road (Birtley Interchange to Kingsway Interchange) (Temporary 50 Miles Per Hour Speed Restriction) Order (SI 2009/3443)
- The A1/A66 Trunk Roads (Scotch Corner Interchange) (Temporary Restriction and Prohibition of Traffic) Order (SI 2009/3444)
- The M60 Motorway (Junction 15, Anticlockwise Exit Slip Road) (Temporary Prohibition of Traffic) Order (SI 2009/3445)
- The M66 Motorway Junction 4 (Southbound Link Road to the M62 Motorway Eastbound) (Temporary Prohibition of Traffic) Order (SI 2009/3446)
- The A590 Trunk Road (Levens Layby Improvement) (Temporary Prohibition and Restriction of Traffic) Order (SI 2009/3447)
- The A590 Trunk Road (Haverthwaite Westbound Layby) (Temporary Restriction of Traffic) Order (SI 2009/3448)
- The M6 Motorway (Junctions 38-37, Southbound Carriageway) (Temporary Restriction of Traffic) (No 2) Order (SI 2009/3449)
- The M61 Motorway (Junction 2 Northbound Link Road to the A666 from the A580) (Temporary Prohibition of Traffic) Order (SI 2009/3450)
- The A66 Trunk Road (Longnewton Interchange to Yarm Road Interchange) (Temporary Restriction and Prohibition of Traffic) Order (SI 2009/3451)
- The M4 Motorway (Rogiet Toll Plaza) (Temporary Restriction of Traffic) Order (SI 2009/3452)
- The M3 Motorway and the A316 Trunk Road (Junction 1, Slip Roads) (Temporary Prohibition of Traffic) Order (SI 2009/3453)
- The A38 Trunk Road (Barton Turn, Staffordshire) (Slip Road) (Temporary Prohibition of Traffic) Order (SI 2009/3454)
- The A38 and A516 Trunk Roads (Southwest of Derby) (Temporary Restriction and Prohibition of Traffic) Order (SI 2009/3455)
- The A1 Trunk Road (Apleyhead, Nottinghamshire) (Temporary Prohibition of Traffic) Order (SI 2009/3456)
- The A38 Trunk Road (Alfreton, Derbyshire) (Temporary Restriction and Prohibition of Traffic) Order (SI 2009/3457)
- The M42 and M1 Motorways and A42 Trunk Road (Appleby Magna to M1 Junction 23A) (Temporary Restriction and Prohibition of Traffic) Order (SI 2009/3458)
- The A46 Trunk Road (near Salford Priors, Warwickshire) (Temporary Restriction of Traffic) Order (SI 2009/3459)
- The A49 Trunk Road (Harewood End, Herefordshire) (Temporary 10 Miles Per Hour and 40 Miles Per Hour Speed Restriction) Order (SI 2009/3460)
- The A49 Trunk Road (Victoria Street, Hereford) (Temporary Prohibition of Traffic) Order (SI 2009/3461)
- The A449 Trunk Road (Coven to Gailey, Staffordshire) (Temporary Restriction and Prohibition of Traffic) Order (SI 2009/3462)
- The A14 Trunk Road (Kelmarsh to Thrapston, Northamptonshire) (Temporary Prohibition of Traffic) Order (SI 2009/3463)
- The A458 Trunk Road (Ford, Shropshire) (Temporary Prohibition and Restriction of Traffic) Order (SI 2009/3464)
- The A5111 Trunk Road (Raynesway, Derby) (Temporary Restriction and Prohibition of Traffic) Order (SI 2009/3465)
- The M5 and M42 Motorways (M5 Junctions 4a to 5) (Temporary Restriction and Prohibition of Traffic) Order (SI 2009/3466)
- The M6 Motorway (Junction 2) (Slip Roads) (Temporary Prohibition of Traffic) Order (SI 2009/3467)
- The East Harling Internal Drainage District (Alteration of Boundaries) Order (SI 2009/3468)

== See also ==
- List of statutory instruments of the United Kingdom
