= Overload (magazine) =

Bi-monthly professional computer magazine

- Overload #92
- Editor: Frances Buontempo
- Categories: Computer magazines
- Frequency: Bi-Monthly
- Publisher: ACCU
- First issue: April 1993
- Country: United Kingdom
- Based in: Henley on Thames
- Language: English
- Website: Issue List
- ISSN: 1354-3172

Overload is a bi-monthly professional computer magazine published by ACCU, that was established in 1993 and is edited by Frances Buontempo. It aims to "publish a high standard of articles about all aspects of software development". All issues of Overload, starting from August 1998, are available online.

== History ==
Overload was started in 1993 as a magazine of the "Turbo C++ SIG". By 1994, it had become a "journal of C++ SIG", with an appropriate change in scope. At that time there were several magazines with similar scope, including C/C++ Users Journal, C++ Report, and to a lesser extent, Dr. Dobb's Journal. The scope of Overload continued to be broadened and in 2000 the magazine was relabeled from "journal of C++ SIG" to "journal of ACCU". About the same time, a board of "readers" was established, to assist authors with improving their articles.

Over time, many competing publications have been discontinued (C++ Report has been discontinued in 2002, C/C++ Users Journal in 2006, Dr Dobbs Journal in 2009), and by 2010 Overload has become the only magazine to cover this area, which has attracted articles of notable writers such as former contributing editor of C/C++ Users Journal Matthew Wilson and creator of C++ Bjarne Stroustrup.

Since its establishment, the scope of the magazine has evolved from issues specific to C/C++ into all aspects of software development, with a particular emphasis on Agile software development. In 2005 Overload published a Quality Manifesto by Tom Gilb.

== Notable contributors ==
- Bjarne Stroustrup
- Matthew Wilson
- David Abrahams
- Tom Gilb
- David H. Bailey
- Kevlin Henney
- Nicolai Josuttis
- Scott Meyers

== Editors ==
- Frances Buontempo (2012–present)
- Ric Parkin (2008–2012)
- Alan Griffiths (2003–2008)
- John Merrels (1998–2003)
- Sean A. Corfield (1995–1997)
- Mike Toms (1993–1994)
