= Pattern-Oriented Software Architecture =

Book series

- Cover of Volume 1
- A System of Patterns (1996); Patterns for Concurrent and Networked Objects (2000); Patterns for Resource Management (2004); A Pattern Language for Distributed Computing (2007); On Patterns and Pattern Languages (2007)
- Author: Frank Buschmann, Regine Meunier, Hans Rohnert, Peter Sommerlad, Michael Stal, Douglas C. Schmidt, Michael Kircher, Prashant Jain and Kevlin Henney
- Country: United States
- Language: English
- Discipline: Computer programming
- Publisher: Wiley
- Published: 1996; 2000; 2004; 2007
- Media type: Print
- No. of books: 5

Pattern-Oriented Software Architecture is a series of software engineering books describing software design patterns. The five volumes were published by Wiley between 1996 and 2007 as part of its Wiley Series in Software Design Patterns.

== Volumes ==
Volume	Title	Authors	Year	ISBN
1	A System of Patterns	Frank Buschmann, Regine Meunier, Hans Rohnert, Peter Sommerlad and Michael Stal	1996	ISBN 978-0-471-95869-7
2	Patterns for Concurrent and Networked Objects	Douglas C. Schmidt, Michael Stal, Hans Rohnert and Frank Buschmann	2000	ISBN 978-0-471-60695-6
3	Patterns for Resource Management	Michael Kircher and Prashant Jain	2004	ISBN 978-0-470-84525-7
4	A Pattern Language for Distributed Computing	Frank Buschmann, Kevlin Henney and Douglas C. Schmidt	2007	ISBN 978-0-470-05902-9
5	On Patterns and Pattern Languages	Frank Buschmann, Kevlin Henney and Douglas C. Schmidt	2007	ISBN 978-0-471-48648-0

== Reception ==
David E. DeLano of C++ Report praised the first volume, writing, "Overall this text is good and I recommend it as an addition to any collection of books on patterns." He said "some of the language and grammar usage feels awkward to the reader" and some of the book has "stiffness and flow problems". Ian Graham reviewed the first volume in the Journal of Object-Oriented Programming. DBMS columnist David S. Linthicum found the first volume to be "the best book on patterns for application architects", while Bin Yang of JavaWorld thought it had "many interesting architecture and design patterns".

ACCU writer Ian Glassborow reviewed the second volume, writing, "This book is one of the more important contributions to the literature on 'patterns' and deserves to become a standard text on its specified area of interest." The Software Engineering Institute author Paul Clemente found the first two volumes to be "the best-known catalog of architectural patterns". Regarding the third volume, D. Murali recommended that software engineers should follow the "eager acquisition" pattern.
