= Posa =

Posa may refer to:

- Posa, Iran
- Poša, Slovakia
- Lajos Pósa (mathematician)
- Victor Posa, ice hockey player
- Pouze (Occitan: Posa), southwestern France
- Ponsa (Hungarian: Posa), 13th-century Dominican friar and Bishop of Bosnia

== See also ==
- POSA (disambiguation)
- Poza (disambiguation)
- Possa
