= Alan F. Blackwell =

Cognition scientist and professor

Alan F. Blackwell (born 1962) is a New Zealand-British cognition scientist and professor at the Computer Laboratory, University of Cambridge, known for his work on diagrammatic representation, on data and language modelling, investment modelling, and end-user software engineering.

== Biography ==
Born in Wellington, New Zealand, Blackwell attended Newlands College, and received his BA in Electronic Engineering from the University of Auckland, and studied Comparative Religion and Medieval History at Massey University. Subsequently, he obtained his MA in Computer Science from the Victoria University of Wellington, and later on his PhD in Psychology at Cambridge University.

After completing his MA, Blackwell started working at the New Zealand software company Progeni Systems Limited. In the UK he was a systems analyst for Cambridge Consultants Limited, where he designed real-time diagnostic and encryption systems. He later moved to Hitachi, where he worked at its Europe Advanced Software Centre. In the late 1990s, he joined the Computer Laboratory at Cambridge and became a reader at the University of Cambridge, Department of Neuroscience.

== Work ==
Blackwell's research interest is in the field of constructing and applying "models of human behaviour when interacting with technology." Blackwell explained that "these models take a variety of forms, not all drawing on neuroscience, but I have a particular interest in neuroeconomic models of abstraction formation and use. This theoretical base is broadly applicable to the design of new technologies, including software that is programmable and customisable by end-users, and the use of domestic technologies."

=== Diagrammatic representation and reasoning ===
In the 1990s Blackwell started his academic research in diagrammatic representation and reasoning. With Yuri Engelhardt he investigated its history and developed a "taxonomy of diagram taxonomies" (1998), and a "meta-taxonomy for diagram research" (2002). In 2001 he edited the Springer publication Thinking with Diagrams. In its introduction he described that diagrams have an important role in problem representation:

One of the central insights offered to cognitive science by artificial intelligence research is the importance of problem representation when creating effective implementations of intelligent behaviour. This is mirrored in experimental psychology by studies demonstrating that the form in which a problem is presented can make structurally identical problems either very easy or very difficult to solve. Diagrams are an interesting artefact for this reason — their purpose is purely to modify the representation of problem situations.

According to Blackwell, many questions about diagrams have remained open. One of the reasons is its status between linguistics and perceptual theory:

Diagrams are not easily amenable to the methods that have been used to investigate other varieties of human markings. They are not linguistic in the way that speech and written text tend to be. Neither are they pictorial representations. This means that neither linguistic nor perceptual theories are sufficient to completely explain their advantages and applications.

In the late 1990s Blackwell also wrote a tutorial on the cognitive dimensions of notations with Thomas R.G. Green.

== Selected publications ==
- —, ed. (30 April 2001). Thinking with Diagrams. Springer Science & Business Media.
- with Marriott, Kim; Shimojima, Atsushi (March 22–24, 2004). Diagrammatic Representation and Inference. Third international conference, Diagrams 2004. Cambridge, UK.
- Blackwell, A.F., 2024. Moral codes: designing alternatives to AI. MIT Press.

Articles, a selection:

- with Petre, Marian (1999). "Mental imagery in program design and visual programming". International Journal of Human-Computer Studies. 51 (1): 7–30. doi:10.1006/ijhc.1999.0267.
- with Ward, David J.; MacKay, David J. C. (2000). Dasher—a data entry interface using continuous gestures and language models (PDF). Proceedings of the 13th annual ACM symposium on User interface software and technology. ACM. Archived from the original (PDF) on 2016-03-04.
- with Hague, Rob (2001). AutoHAN: An architecture for programming the home. Proceedings IEEE Symposia on Human-Centric Computing Languages and Environments 2001. IEEE.
- — (2002). First steps in programming: A rationale for attention investment models (PDF). Proceedings of the IEEE 2002 Symposia on Human Centric Computing Languages and Environments. IEEE.
- — (2006). "The reification of metaphor as a design tool" (PDF). ACM Transactions on Computer-Human Interaction. 13 (4): 490–530. doi:10.1145/1188816.1188820. S2CID 3035279.
- with Ko, Andrew J.; Abraham, Robin; Beckwith, Laura; Burnett, Margaret; Erwig, Martin; Lawrance, Joseph; Scaffidi, Chris; Lieberman, Henry; Myers, Brad; Rosson, Mary Beth; Rothermel, Gregg; Shaw, Mary; Wiedenbeck, S. (2011). "The state of the art in end-user software engineering". ACM Computing Surveys. 43 (3): 21. doi:10.1145/1922649.1922658. S2CID 9435548.
