= Poza =

Poza or Pozas may refer to:

== Geography ==
- Poza Rica, city in Veracruz, Mexico
  - C.D. Poza Rica, football team in Poza Rica
- Poza de la Sal, town in Castille and León, Spain
- Poza de la Vega, municipality in Castille and León, Spain
- Pozas, Ciales, Puerto Rico, barrio in Ciales, Puerto Rico
- Pozas, San Sebastián, Puerto Rico, barrio in San Sebastián, Puerto Rico
- Pozas Formation, geologic formation in Puerto Rico

== People ==
- Francisco Javier Pozas (born 1964), Mexican wrestler known as Pantera
- Gerado Campos Poza (born 1978), Mexican wrestler known as Último Gladiador
- Jéssica Miroslava Eterovic Pozas, Chilean delegate for Miss World 1993
- Jorge Poza (born 1976), Mexican actor
- Manu Quijera Poza (born 1998), Spanish javelin thrower
- Nathalie Poza (born 1972), Spanish actress
- Nicolás Quijera Poza (born 1996), Spanish javelin thrower
- Ricardo Pozas Arciniega (1912–1994), Mexican anthropologist
- Sebastián Pozas Perea (1876–1946), Spanish military officer

== Other uses ==
- Las Pozas, a garden near Xilitla, Mexico
- Alan Poza, Nigerian romantic comedy film
- Poza prawem, album by The Analogs

== See also ==
- Posa (disambiguation)
