= ACCU =

ACCU may refer to:

- Autodefensas Campesinas de Cordoba y Uraba, a Colombian paramilitary group
- Accu (battery), a battery that can be restored to full charge by the application of electrical energy
- ACCU (organisation), a software development user group
- Association of Catholic Colleges and Universities
- People's Choice Credit Union, formerly the Australian Central Credit Union
- Asia/Pacific Cultural Centre for UNESCO
- Aquarian Christine Church Universal, a religious movement founded by Levi Dowling
