= Conway's law =

Adage linking design systems to communication structures

Conway's law describes the link between communication structure of organizations and the systems they design. It is named after the computer scientist and programmer Melvin Conway, who introduced the idea in 1967. His original wording was:

[O]rganizations which design systems (in the broad sense used here) are constrained to produce designs which are copies of the communication structures of these organizations.

— Melvin E. Conway, How Do Committees Invent?

The law is based on the reasoning that in order for a product to function, the authors and designers of its component parts must communicate with each other in order to ensure compatibility between the components. Therefore, the technical structure of a system will reflect the social boundaries of the organizations that produced it, across which communication is more difficult. In colloquial terms, it means complex products end up "shaped like" the organizational structure they are designed in or designed for. The law is applied primarily in the field of software architecture, though Conway directed it more broadly and its assumptions and conclusions apply to most technical fields.

== Interpretations ==
The law is, in a strict sense, only about correspondence; it does not state that communication structure is the cause of system structure, merely describes the connection. Different commentators have taken various positions on the direction of causality; that technical design causes the organization to restructure to fit, that the organizational structure dictates the technical design, or both. Conway's law was intended originally as a sociological observation, but many other interpretations are possible. The New Hacker's Dictionary entry uses it in a primarily humorous context, while participants at the 1968 National Symposium on Modular Programming considered it sufficiently serious and universal to dub it 'Conway's Law'. Opinions also vary on the desirability of the phenomenon; some say that the mirroring pattern is a helpful feature of such systems, while other interpretations say it's an undesirable result of organizational bias. Middle positions describe it as a necessary feature of compromise, undesirable in the abstract but necessary to handle human limitations.

== Examples ==
Nigel Bevan stated in a 1997 paper, regarding usability issues in websites: "Organizations often produce web sites with a content and structure which mirrors the internal concerns of the organization rather than the needs of the users of the site."

Evidence in support of Conway's law has been published by a team of Massachusetts Institute of Technology (MIT) and Harvard Business School researchers who, using "the mirroring hypothesis" as an equivalent term for Conway's law, found "strong evidence to support the mirroring hypothesis", and that the "product developed by the loosely-coupled organization is significantly more modular than the product from the tightly-coupled organization". The authors highlight the impact of "organizational design decisions on the technical structure of the artifacts that these organizations subsequently develop".

Additional and likewise supportive case studies of Conway's law have been conducted by Nagappan, Murphy and Basili at the University of Maryland in collaboration with Microsoft, and by Syeed and Hammouda at Tampere University of Technology in Finland.

== Variations ==
Edward Yourdon and Larry Constantine, in their 1979 book on Structured Design, gave a more strongly stated variation of Conway's Law:

The structure of any system designed by an organization is isomorphic to the structure of the organization.

James O. Coplien and Neil B. Harrison stated in a 2004 book concerned with organizational patterns of agile software development:

If the parts of an organization (e.g., teams, departments, or subdivisions) do not closely reflect the essential parts of the product, or if the relationships between organizations do not reflect the relationships between product parts, then the project will be in trouble ... Therefore: Make sure the organization is compatible with the product architecture.

== See also ==
- Cognitive dimensions of notations
- Deutsch limit
- Organizational theory
- Inner-platform effect
- Isomorphism (sociology)
- Good regulator
