= Pattern Languages of Programs =

Annual conference series on software design patterns

- Abbreviation: PLoP
- Discipline: software design patterns

Publication details
- Publisher: ACM
- History: 1994–present
- Frequency: annual
- Website: www.hillside.net/plop

Sponsored by The Hillside Group
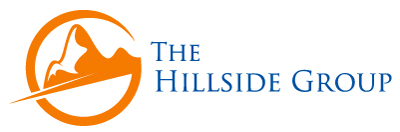
- Website: www.hillside.net

Pattern Languages of Programs is a group of annual conferences sponsored by The Hillside Group. The purpose of these conferences is to develop and refine the art of software design patterns. Most of the effort focuses on developing a textual presentation of a pattern such that it becomes easy to understand and apply. This is typically done in a writers' workshop setting.

== The flagship conference ==
The flagship conference is called the Pattern Languages of Programs conference, abbreviated as PLoP. PLoP has been held in the U.S.A. since 1994. Until 2004 it was held annually at Allerton Park in Monticello, Illinois, a property of the University of Illinois at Urbana Champaign. Since then, its location has alternated between Allerton park and being co-located with OOPSLA, a large computer science conference, with the Agile Conference in 2009, and with PUARL in 2018. The 27th PLoP will be held in Keystone, Colorado.

Notable people who chaired the conference in the past include Ward Cunningham, Richard Gabriel, Ralph Johnson, John Vlissides and Kent Beck.

PLoP (and several other Pattern Languages of Programs conferences) are sponsored by The Hillside Group, a U.S.-based non-profit organization that holds the PLoP trademark and the rights to the conference.

== Other PLoP conferences ==
=== AsianPLoP ===
AsianPLoP is the PLoP event for the Asian community, commonly featuring patterns in both English and Japanese language.

Year	Location	Conference Chair	Program Chair
AsianPLoP 2015	Tokyo, Japan		
AsianPLoP 2014	Tokyo, Japan	Hironori Washizaki	Yasunobu Kawaguchi, Takashi Iba
AsianPLoP 2011	Tokyo, Japan		Masanari Motohashi
AsianPLoP 2010	Tokyo, Japan	Eiichi Hanyuda	Hironori Washizaki, Nobukazu Yoshioka

=== ChiliPLoP ===
ChiliPLoP is an annual conference featuring "hot topics" of the PLoP community. It is held in the U.S. since 1998.

Year	Location	Conference Chair	Program Chair
ChiliPLoP 2011	Carefree, Arizona, United States	Rick Mercer	Eugene Wallingford
ChiliPLoP 2010	Carefree, Arizona, United States	Rick Mercer	Ralph Johnson
ChiliPLoP 1997	Wickenburg Inn, Arizona, United States	Linda Rising	

=== EuroPLoP ===
Held since 1996 in Kloster Irsee, Germany (former monastery, now Swabian Conference and Education Centre).

Year	Location	Conference Chair	Program Chair
EuroPLoP 2017	Kloster Irsee, Bavaria, Germany	Christian Kreiner	Christopher Preschern
EuroPLoP 2016	Kloster Irsee, Bavaria, Germany	Christopher Preschern	Veli-Pekka Eloranta
EuroPLoP 2015	Kloster Irsee, Bavaria, Germany	Claudius Link	Veli-Pekka Eloranta
EuroPLoP 2014	Kloster Irsee, Bavaria, Germany	Veli-Pekka Eloranta	Uwe van Heesch
EuroPLoP 2013	Kloster Irsee, Bavaria, Germany	Uwe van Heesch	Christian Kohls
EuroPLoP 2012	Kloster Irsee, Bavaria, Germany	Christian Kohls	Andreas Fiesser
EuroPLoP 2011	Kloster Irsee, Bavaria, Germany	Andreas Fiesser	Paris Avgeriou
EuroPLoP 2010	Kloster Irsee, Bavaria, Germany	Paris Avgeriou	Michael Weiss
EuroPLoP 2009	Kloster Irsee, Bavaria, Germany	Michael Weiss	Allan Kelly
EuroPLoP 2008	Kloster Irsee, Bavaria, Germany	Allan Kelly	Till Schümmer
EuroPLoP 2007	Kloster Irsee, Bavaria, Germany	Till Schümmer	Lise Hvatum
EuroPLoP 2006	Kloster Irsee, Bavaria, Germany	Lise Hvatum	Uwe Zdun
EuroPLoP 2005	Kloster Irsee, Bavaria, Germany	Uwe Zdun	Andy Longshaw
EuroPLoP 2004	Kloster Irsee, Bavaria, Germany	Dietmar Schütz	Klaus Marquardt
EuroPLoP 2003	Kloster Irsee, Bavaria, Germany	Dietmar Schütz	Kevlin Henney
EuroPLoP 2002	Kloster Irsee, Bavaria, Germany	Jutta Eckstein, Christa Schwanninger	Alan O'Callaghan
EuroPLoP 2001	Kloster Irsee, Bavaria, Germany	Jutta Eckstein, Christa Schwanninger	Andreas Rüping
EuroPLoP 2000	Kloster Irsee, Bavaria, Germany	Andreas Rüping	Martine Devos
EuroPLoP 1999	Kloster Irsee, Bavaria, Germany	Martine Devos	Paul Dyson
EuroPLoP 1998	Kloster Irsee, Bavaria, Germany	Paul Dyson	Jens Coldewey
EuroPLoP 1997	Kloster Irsee, Bavaria, Germany	Frank Buschmann	Dirk Riehle
EuroPLoP 1996	Kloster Irsee, Bavaria, Germany	Frank Buschmann	Bruce Anderson

=== KoalaPLoP ===
Held in Australia or New Zealand.

Year	Location	Conference Chair	Program Chair
KoalaPLoP 2002	Melbourne, Australia	Paul Taylor	James Noble, Brian Foote
KoalaPLoP 2000	Melbourne, Australia	Darius Zakrzewski	Jim Coplien

=== MensorePLoP ===
MensorePLoP '2001, held on the island of Okinawa, Japan.

Year	Location	Conference Chair	Program Chair
MensorePLoP '2001	Okinawa, Japan	Terunobu Fujino	Jim Coplien

=== MiniPLoP ===
MiniPLoP'2011, held in IME/USP, São Paulo, Brazil.

Year	Location	Conference Chair	Program Chair
MiniPLoP'2011	São Paulo, Brazil	Eduardo Martins Guerra, Fabio Kon	Claudio Sant'Anna, Joseph W. Yoder

=== ScrumPLoP ===
Year	Location	Conference Chair	Program Chair
ScrumPLoP 2019	Quinta da Pacheca, Portugal		
ScrumPLoP 2018	Quinta da Pacheca, Portugal		
ScrumPLoP 2017	Quinta da Pacheca, Portugal		
ScrumPLoP 2016	Quinta da Pacheca, Portugal		
ScrumPLoP 2015	Quinta da Pacheca, Portugal		
ScrumPLoP 2014	Helsingør, Denmark		
ScrumPLoP 2013	Helsingør, Denmark		
ScrumPLoP 2012	Helsingør, Denmark		
ScrumPLoP 2011	Helsingør, Denmark		
ScrumPLoP 2010	Stora Nyteboda, Sweden		

=== SugarLoafPLoP ===
SugarLoafPLoP, held in Brazil.

Year	Location	Conference Chair	Program Chair
SugarLoafPLoP 2012	Natal, RN, Brazil	Sergio Soares and Uirá Kulesza	Mary Lynn Manns and Rosana T. Vaccare Braga
SugarLoafPLoP 2010	Salvador, Bahia, Brazil	Christina Chavez and Claudio Sant'Anna	Rebecca Wirfs-Brock and Uirá Kulesza
...			
SugarLoafPLoP 2001	Rio de Janeiro, Brazil	Rosana Maria Castro Andrade and Claudia M. L Werner	James O. Coplien and Jorge L. Ortega Arjona

=== VikingPLoP ===
VikingPLoP, held mostly in the Scandinavian countries, but also moving around in Europe.

Year	Location	Program Chairs
VikingPLoP 2002	Höjstrupgård castle near Helsingör in Denmark, Denmark	Kristian Elof Soerensen
VikingPLoP 2003	Bergen, Norway	Cecilia Haskins
VikingPLoP 2004	Uppsala, Sweden	Rebecca Rikner
VikingPLoP 2005	Helsinki, Finland	Juha Pärssinen
VikingPLoP 2007	Bergen, Norway	Cecilia Haskins
VikingPLoP 2008	Stora Nyteboda, Sweden	
VikingPLoP 2012	Saariselkä, Finland	Veli-Pekka Eloranta and Marko Leppänen
VikingPLoP 2013	Ikaalinen, Finland	Veli-Pekka Eloranta and Marko Leppänen
VikingPLoP 2014	Sagadi manor, Estonia	Jari Rauhamäki and Veli-Pekka Eloranta
VikingPLoP 2015	Ribaritsa resort, Bulgaria	Jari Rauhamäki and Elissaveta Gourova
VikingPLoP 2016	Wassenaar, Netherlands	Jari Rauhamäki and Christian Köppe
VikingPLoP 2017	Grube/Schleswig-Holstein, Germany	Christian Kohls and Klaus Marquardt
VikingPLoP 2018 (cancelled)	Fredensborg, Denmark	Bogdana Botez

== Publications ==
The conference proceedings are typically published locally as technical reports of a sponsoring university. From 1998 to 2007, EuroPLoP papers were published annually by the German publisher Universitätsverlag Konstanz.

Between 2008 and 2012 proceedings appeared in several places. CEUR-WS holds papers for 2008 and papers for 2009 (in addition a complete set of 2009 papers are available from Lulu.com in printed and PDF formats). A printed version of EuroPLoP 2012 papers are also available on Lulu.com.

Since 2012 a subset of EuroPLoP papers have been submitted to the ACM Digital Library.

After the conference, authors are given the chance to submit a revised paper for publication in the book series Pattern Languages of Program Design by Addison Wesley.

In 2007, an academic journal was started, called Transactions on Pattern Languages of Programming. The editors-in-chief are James Noble and Ralph Johnson and the European editor is Uwe Zdun. The journal is published by Springer-Verlag.

== See also ==
- Pattern language where the name and concept arose from
