= Linda Rising =

American academic

- Born: United States
- Education: University of Kansas (BA, Chemistry); Southern Illinois University (MS, Computer Science); Southwest Missouri State University (MA, Mathematics); Arizona State University (PhD, Computer Science)
- Occupations: Author, lecturer, consultant
- Employer(s): Independent consultant IEEE Software (Insights editor)
- Known for: Applying design patterns to organizational change Agile mindset advocacy
- Notable work: Fearless Change (2004); The Pattern Almanac 2000 (2000); Design Patterns in Communication Software (2001)
- Website: https://lindarising.org/

Linda Rising is an American author, lecturer, independent consultant. Rising has written and spoken about applying software design patterns to organizational change. Her work is associated with the broader development of Agile software methodologies in the late 20th and early 21st centuries.

== University education ==
In 1964, Rising obtained a bachelor's degree in chemistry at the University of Kansas, in 1984 a Master of Science degree in computer science at Southern Illinois University and in 1987 a M. A. in mathematics at the Southwest Missouri State University. In 1992, Rising obtained her PhD degree in computer science from the Arizona State University, with her thesis entitled Information hiding metrics for modular programming languages relating to object-based design metrics.

== Career ==
Rising taught as instructor in mathematics and computer science at various universities throughout the midwest from 1977 to 1984 and worked as assistant professor from 1984 to 1987 at Indiana University – Purdue University Fort Wayne.

Rising has worked in the areas of telecommunications, avionics, and tactical weapons systems.

Rising has extended the use of patterns, building upon the work of Christopher Alexander on a pattern language for architecture and the work of the Gang of Four on patterns for software development. She extended the use of patterns to the support of organisational change. Her work and lectures cover patterns, retrospectives, agile development approaches and the change process, topics on which she has given lectures.

Since 2010, she is editor of the Insights series of the IEEE Software magazine.

=== Published material ===
Her book, The Pattern Almanac 2000, compiles software design patterns from earlier publications and has been cited in subsequent research. provides a comprehensive inventory of patterns compiled from publications in patterns conferences and books prior to the year 2000. Rising's indexing of existing patterns is seen as "a significant start toward achieving the ultimate goal of a pattern database."

The study The scrum software development process for small teams by Rising and Norman S. Janoff is cited as first published study in which the scrum, a development process for small teams which includes a series of "sprints" which each last typically between one and four weeks, was tested in real-life projects. The study has been cited for showing "that nonhierarchical teams work more effectively through the complex iterations and time-consuming gestation of a software program" and that "they gain strength through shared successes and failures".

She is editor of the book Design Patterns in Communication Software, a compendium of patterns, which appeared 2001. Contributors to her book include experts from the patterns community such as James O. Coplien and Douglas C. Schmidt. She wrote of Fearless Change: Patterns for Introducing New Ideas, co-authored with Mary Lynn Manns and published 2004.

=== Keynote speeches ===
Rising has given keynote speeches at the agile 2007 conference, the OOP 2009 conference, the Agile testing days Berlin 2010, at the GOTO Amsterdam 2014 conference, and at the European Testing Conference 2016 in Bukarest.

Rising lives in Phoenix, Arizona.

== Books ==
- Mary Lynn Manns, Linda Rising: Fearless Change: Patterns for Introducing New Ideas, Addison-Wesley, 2004, ISBN 978-0-201-74157-5 - cited ca. 60 times
- Linda Rising (Editor), Douglas C. Schmidt (Foreword): Design Patterns in Communication Software, Cambridge University Press, 2001, ISBN 978-0-521-79040-6 - abstract - cited ca. 50 times
- Linda Rising: The Pattern Almanac 2000, Addison Wesley, 2000, ISBN 978-0-201-61567-8 - cited ca. 30 times
- Linda Rising: The Patterns Handbook: Techniques, Strategies, and Applications, SIGS Reference Library, Cambridge University Press, 1998, ISBN 978-0-521-64818-9
- Linda Rising: Patterns Handbook: Best Practices, Cambridge University Press, 1997, ISBN 1-884842-59-3 - cited ca. 25 times
- Linda Sue Rising: Information hiding metrics for modular programming languages, Doctoral Dissertation, Arizona State University, 1992
- Works by Linda Rising at Open Library
