= Andrei Alexandrescu =

Romanian-American computer programmer

Andrei Alexandrescu Ph.D.
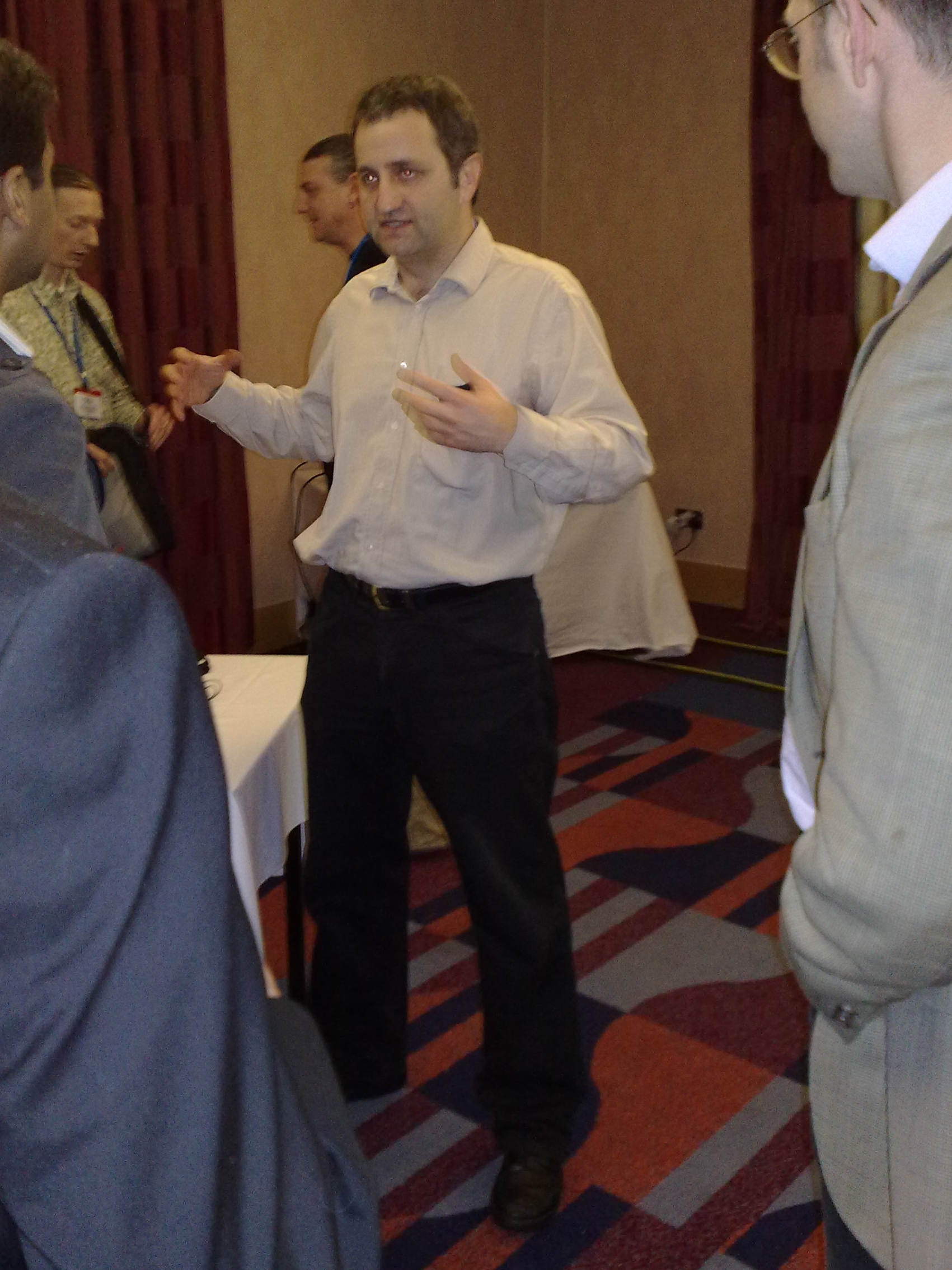
- Alexandrescu at ACCU 2009
- Born: 1969 (age 56–57); Bucharest, Romania
- Education: B.S. 1994: Politehnica University of Bucharest; M.S. 2003, Ph.D. 2009: University of Washington
- Known for: C++ and D programming expert D co-developer Scope guard idiom
- Notable work: Books: Modern C++ Design; C++ Coding Standards; The D Programming Language; Software libraries: Loki, MOJO
- Spouse: Sanda Alexandrescu
- Scientific career
- Fields: Computer science
- Institutions: Netzip–RealNetworks; Facebook; Nvidia
- Thesis: Scalable Graph-Based Learning Applied to Human Language Technology (2009)
- Doctoral advisor: Katrin Kirchhoff
- Website: erdani.org

Tudor Andrei Cristian Alexandrescu (born 1969) is a Romanian-American programmer and author specializing in the programming languages C++ and D. He is especially known for his pioneering work on policy-based design implemented via template metaprogramming. These ideas are articulated in his book Modern C++ Design and were first implemented in his programming library, Loki. He also implemented the move constructors concept in his library MOJO. He contributed to the C/C++ Users Journal under the byline "Generic<Programming>".

He became an American citizen in August 2014.

== Education and career ==
Alexandrescu received a Bachelor of Science (B.S.) degree in Electrical Engineering from Polytechnic University of Bucharest (Universitatea Politehnica din București) in July 1994.

In September 1998, his first article was published in the C/C++ Users Journal. From April 1999 until February 2000, he was a program manager for Netzip, Inc. When the company was acquired by RealNetworks, Inc., he served there as a development manager from February 2000 through September 2001.

In 2001, Alexandrescu released the book Modern C++ Design, reviewed as one of the five most important C++ books by C++ expert Scott Meyers.

In 2003, Alexandrescu earned a Master of Science (M.S.), and in 2009, a Doctor of Philosophy (Ph.D.) in computer science from the University of Washington.

In 2006, Alexandrescu began assisting Walter Bright in developing the D programming language. In May 2010, he released a book titled The D Programming Language.

From 2010 to 2014, Alexandrescu, Herb Sutter, and Scott Meyers ran a small annual technical conference named C++ and Beyond.

Alexandrescu worked as a research scientist at Facebook for over 5 years, before leaving the firm in August 2015 to focus on developing the D language.

In January 2022, Alexandrescu began working at Nvidia as a Principal Research Scientist.

== Contributions ==
=== The D programming language ===
Along with Walter Bright, Alexandrescu has been one of the two main designers of the D language, and the main maintainer of the standard library Phobos from 2007 to 2019. He is the founder of the D Language Foundation. His contributions include the module ranges. He is the author of The D Programming Language book.

=== Expected ===
Expected is a template class for C++ which is on the C++ Standards track. Alexandrescu proposes Expected<T> as a class for use as a return value which contains either a T or the exception preventing its creation, which is an improvement over use of either return codes or exceptions exclusively. Expected can be thought of as a restriction of sum (union) types or algebraic data types in various languages, e.g., Hope, or the more recent Haskell and Gallina; or of the error handling mechanism of Google's Go, or the Result type in Rust.

He explains the benefits of Expected<T> as:

- Associates errors with computational goals
- Naturally allows multiple exceptions in flight
- Switch between "error handling" and "exception throwing" styles
- Teleportation possible across thread boundaries, across nothrow subsystem boundaries and across time (save now, throw later)
- Collect, group, combine exceptions

==== Example ====
For example, instead of any of the following common function prototypes:

int parseInt(const string&);  // Returns 0 on error and sets errno.

or

int parseInt(const string&);  // Throws invalid_input or overflow

he proposes the following:

Expected<int> parseInt(const string&);  // Returns an expected int: either an int or an exception

=== Scope guard ===
From 2000 onwards, Alexandrescu has advocated and popularized the scope guard idiom. He has introduced it as a language construct in D. It has been implemented by others in many other languages.

== Bibliography ==
- Andrei Alexandrescu (February 2001). Modern C++ Design: Generic Programming and Design Patterns Applied. Addison-Wesley. ISBN 978-0-201-70431-0.
- Herb Sutter, Andrei Alexandrescu (November 2004). C++ Coding Standards: 101 Rules, Guidelines, and Best Practices. Addison-Wesley. ISBN 978-0-321-11358-0.
- Andrei Alexandrescu (June 2010). The D Programming Language. Addison-Wesley. ISBN 978-0-321-63536-5.
