= Kevlin =

Kevlin may refer to:

- Kevlin Henney, author, presenter, and consultant on software development, active 2001–present
- 25118 Kevlin, minor planet

== See also ==
- Kelvin
