= C++ Report =

- C++ Report Vol 10. No.7, July/Aug 1998
- Editor: Robert Cecil Martin
- Categories: Computer magazines
- Frequency: Bi-Monthly
- Publisher: SIGS Publications Group
- Founded: 1989
- Final issue: 2002
- Country: United States
- Based in: New York City
- Language: English

C++ Report was a bi-monthly professional computer magazine published by SIGS Publications Group. It was edited by Robert Murray, Stanley B. Lippman, Douglas C. Schmidt, Brad Appleton, Robert Cecil Martin, and Herb Sutter and aimed to cover various issues related to C++ programming language. It was recognized as an important publication related to C++.

== Notable contributors ==
- Douglas C. Schmidt
- Robert Cecil Martin
- Scott Meyers
- Tom Cargill
- Jim Coplien (a.k.a. James O. Coplien)
- David Abrahams
- Andrew Koenig

== See also ==
- List of computer magazines
