= Gordon Rugg =

British scientist (born 1955)

Gordon Rugg (born 1955) is a British academic, head of the Knowledge Modelling Group at Keele University and a visiting senior research fellow at the Open University, known for his work on the Voynich manuscript.

== Biography ==
Born in Perth, Scotland, Rugg has a first degree in French and Linguistics and a PhD in psychology, both from Reading University, UK.

His background includes working as a timberyard worker, a field archaeologist and an English lecturer. He became the focus of media attention in 2004 for his work on the Voynich manuscript.

He is co-author with Marian Petre of two books for students which focus on semi-tacit skills in research. He is head of the Knowledge Modelling Group at Keele University and a visiting senior research fellow at the Open University.

== Research ==
His main research theme is elicitation methods – techniques for eliciting information from people, for purposes such as market research and requirements gathering for software development. His main work in this field includes the following.

- A series of co-authored papers on card sorts.
- A series of co-authored papers on laddering, including one which integrates laddering with graph theory.
- A paper co-authored with Neil Maiden, describing a framework for choosing the appropriate methods to elicit various types of semi-tacit and tacit knowledge.

This work formed one main strand in the Verifier method which he developed with Joanne Hyde. This is a method for critically re-assessing previous research into difficult problems. The initial stage uses a range of elicitation methods to gain an accurate picture of the assumptions and normal working practices used in the previous work. The next stage uses a knowledge of experts’ behaviour and a range of error taxonomies to identify the places where human error is most likely to have occurred. The final stage uses various formalisms to assess whether or not an error actually has occurred. There is no guarantee that this method will catch every error – it is not a method for proving the correctness of a piece of previous work – but it improves the chances of finding key errors.

Rugg's other work is multidisciplinary, including theoretical archaeology and teaching methods.

=== Voynich manuscript ===
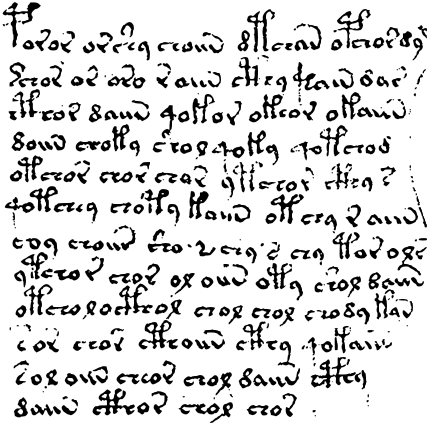
The Voynich manuscript is written in an unknown script.

Rugg used an informal version of the Verifier method to re-assess previous work on the Voynich manuscript, a manuscript widely believed to be a ciphertext based on a code which had resisted decipherment since the manuscript's rediscovery by Wilfrid Voynich in 1912. Previous research had concluded that the manuscript contained linguistic features too complex to be readily explicable as a hoax, and too strange to be explicable as a transliteration of an unidentified language, leaving an uncracked cipher as the only realistic explanation.

Rugg suggested that these assessments of complexity were not based on empirical evidence. He examined a range of techniques known in the late sixteenth century, and found that, by using a modified Cardan grille combined with a large table of meaningless syllables, it was possible to produce meaningless text that had qualitative and statistical properties similar to those of "Voynichese". Rugg replicated the drawings from a range of pages in the manuscript, accompanying each with the same quantity of text as found in the original page, and discovered that most pages could be reproduced in one to two hours, as fast as they could be transcribed. This suggested that a meaningless hoax manuscript as long and as apparently linguistically complex as the Voynich manuscript could be produced, complete with coloured illustrations, by a single person in between 250 and 500 hours.

However, there is debate about the features of the manuscript which Rugg's suggested method was not able to emulate. The two main features are lines showing different linguistic features from the bulk of the manuscript, such as the Neal keys, and the statistical properties of the text produced. Rugg argues that these linguistic features are trivially easy to hoax using the same approach with a different set of tables, and would add about five minutes to the time to produce each page; the counter-argument is that this makes the hoax too complex to be plausible. Regarding statistics, Rugg points out that text produced from the same set of initial nonsense syllables but using different table structures shows widely different statistical properties. Since there are tens of thousands of permutations of table design, he argues that it would simply be a question of time to find a design which produced the same statistical properties as "Voynichese". Whether or not this would prove anything useful is another issue, since it could either be used to support Rugg's argument, or dismissed as coincidence.

Further counterarguments are:

- There is no historical evidence showing that Cardan grilles were used for this kind of purpose at any time in history
- The radiocarbon dating, codicology and palaeography all indicate that the manuscript was constructed roughly a century before Cardan grilles were devised
- The mathematical concept of randomness was not yet fully formed in the time period proposed

The debate continues.

== Selected publications ==
- Petre, Marian, and Gordon Rugg. The unwritten rules of PhD research. McGraw-Hill International, 2010.

Articles, a selection:

- Maiden, N. A. M., and Gordon Rugg. "ACRE: selecting methods for requirements acquisition." Software Engineering Journal 11.3 (1996): 183-192.
- Rugg, Gordon, and Peter McGeorge. "The sorting techniques: a tutorial paper on card sorts, picture sorts and item sorts." Expert Systems 14.2 (1997): 80-93.
- Rugg, Gordon. "The mystery of the Voynich Manuscript: New analysis of a famously cryptic medieval document suggests that it contains nothing but gibberish." Scientific American 291.1 (2004): 104109.
