= Possa =

Possa is a surname. Notable people with this surname include:

- Lorenz Possa (1934–2013), Swiss cross-country skier
- Mari Possa (fl. 2003–2013), Salvadoran American pornographic actress and reality TV personality

== See also ==
- Posa (disambiguation)
