= Marian Petre =

British computer scientist

- Born: 1959 (age 66–67)
- Education: University College London (PhD)
- Awards: Royal Society Wolfson Fellowship
- Scientific career
- Fields: Computer science
- Workplaces: Open University
- Thesis: Finding a basis for matching programming languages to programming tasks (1989)
- Website: mcs.open.ac.uk/mp8

Marian Petre (born 1959) is a British computer scientist and Professor of Computing at the Open University and Director of its Centre for Research in Computing (CRC), known for her work on Visual Programming Environments, and co-developed the concept of cognitive dimensions of notations.

== Education ==
Petre obtained her Ph.D. in computer science from the University College London in 1989.

== Career and research ==
In 1990, she started her academic career at the Institute for Perception Research (IPO), in Eindhoven, the Netherlands, which was directed by Theo Bemelmans. Back in Britain she joined the Open University and started cooperation with Thomas R.G. Green, with whom she developed the concept of cognitive dimensions of notations. At the Open University she was eventually promoted to Professor of Computing. Petre was awarded a Royal Society Wolfson Research Merit Award in "recognition of her empirical research into software design."

== Awards and honors ==
She is a recipient of the Royal Society Wolfson Fellowship and an ACM Distinguished Member.

== Selected publications ==
Her selected publications include:

- Fincher, Sally, and Marian Petre, eds. Computer science education research. CRC Press, 2004.
- Petre, Marian, and Gordon Rugg. The unwritten rules of PhD research. McGraw-Hill International, 2010.
- Green, Thomas R.G., Marian Petre, and R. K. E. Bellamy. "Comprehensibility of visual and textual programs: A test of superlativism against the’match-mismatch’conjecture." ESP 91.743 (1991): 121–146.
- Petre, Marian. "Why looking isn't always seeing: readership skills and graphical programming." Communications of the ACM 38.6 (1995): 33–44. doi:10.1145/203241.203251
- Green, Thomas R. G., and Marian Petre. "Usability analysis of visual programming environments: a ‘cognitive dimensions’ framework." Journal of Visual Languages & Computing 7.2 (1996): 131–174. doi:10.1006/jvlc.1996.0009
- Petre, Marian, and Alan F. Blackwell. "Mental imagery in program design and visual programming." International Journal of Human-Computer Studies 51.1 (1999): 7-30.
- Carswell, L., Thomas, P., Petre, M., Price, B., & Richards, M. (2000). "Distance education via the Internet: The student experience." British Journal of Educational Technology, 31(1), 29-46 doi:10.1111/1467-8535.00133
