= Michael Stal =

German computer scientist

- Born: 1963 (age 62–63); Munich
- Citizenship: Germany
- Education: Technical University of Munich
- Known for: Design Patterns
- Scientific career
- Fields: Software engineering
- Workplaces: Siemens AG
- Doctoral advisor: Jan Bosch

Michael Stal (born 1963 in Munich) is a German computer scientist. He received a Ph.D. title from the University of Groningen which appointed him an honorary professorship for software engineering in 2010. Stal is currently working for the corporate technology department of Siemens AG and as a professor at University of Groningen. He is editor-in-chief of the Java programming language magazine JavaSPEKTRUM.

Stal co-authored the book series Pattern-Oriented Software Architecture.

Volume 1 ”A System of Patterns” book introduced Architecture Patterns, classified different categories of Design Patterns, and a method how to use Pattern Systems.

Volume 2 addresses “Patterns for Concurrent and Distributed Objects”.

In addition to software architecture, his research fields comprise distributed computing middleware, systems integration, programming languages, and programming paradigms. Stal has been a member of the Object Management Group and participated in the standardization of C++.

== Works ==
- Michael Stal Understanding and Analyzing Software Architecture (of Distributed Systems) using Patterns, Rijksuniversiteit Groningen, 2007, ISBN 978-90-367-2980-2
- Frank Buschmann, Regine Meunier, Hans Rohnert, Peter Sommerlad, Michael Stal Pattern-Oriented Software Architecture – A System of Patterns, Wiley & Sons, 1996, ISBN 0-471-95869-7
- Douglas C. Schmidt, Michael Stal, Hans Rohnert, Frank Buschmann Pattern-Oriented Software Architecture – Patterns for Concurrent and Networked Objects, Wiley & Sons, 2000, ISBN 0-471-60695-2
