= POSA =

POSA may refer to:

- Pattern-Oriented Software Architecture, a series of books related to architectural patterns in the field of computer science
- Point-of-Sale Activation (or Point-of-Service Activation), gift cards that have no value until purchased and activated at check-out
- Public Order and Security Act (Zimbabwe), a piece of legislation in Zimbabwe
