= Deutsch limit =

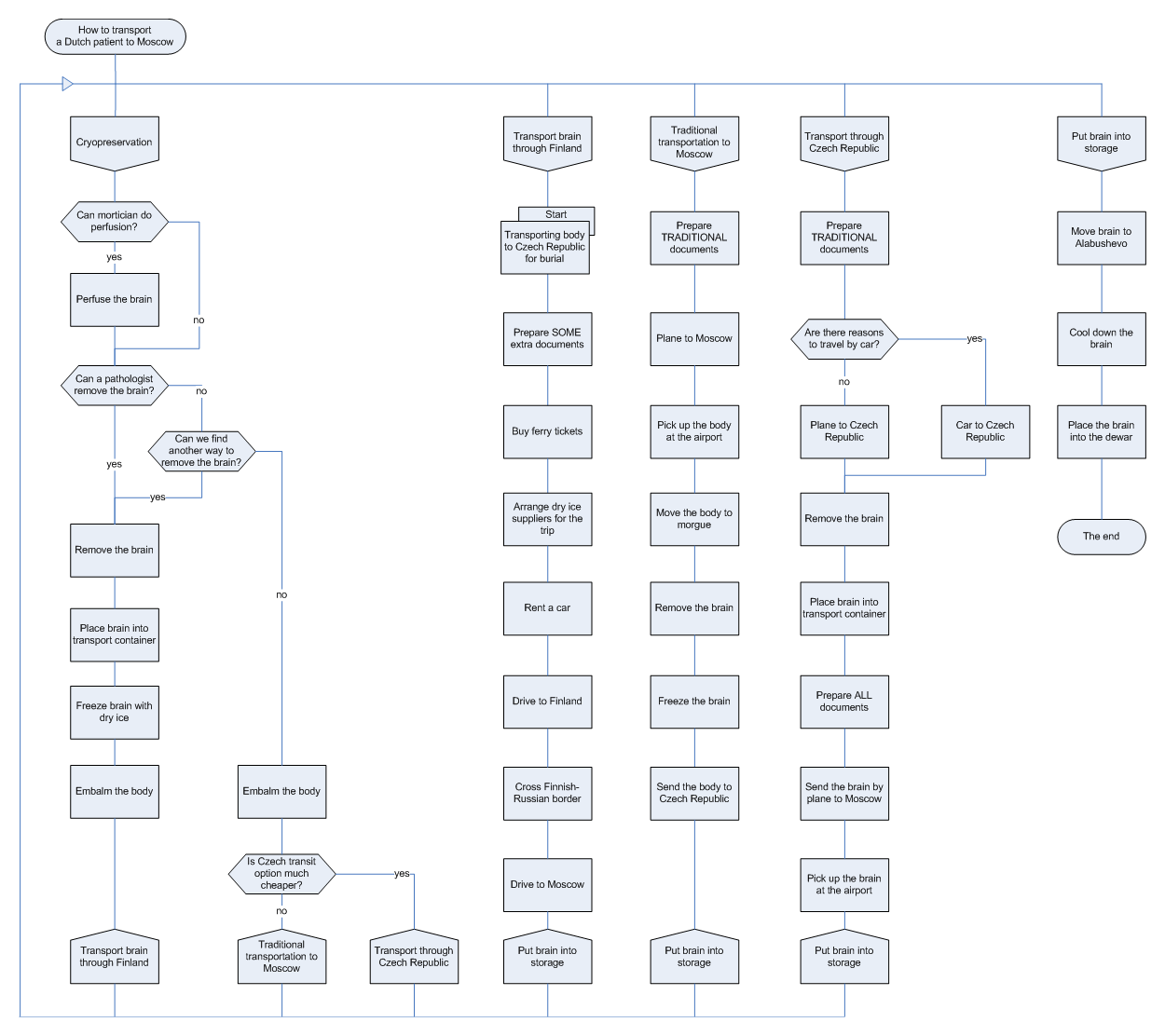
An example program in the visual programming language DRAKON, containing 50 primitives

The Deutsch limit is an aphorism, originated by L. Peter Deutsch, about the information density of visual programming languages:

The problem with visual programming is that you can't have more than 50 visual primitives on the screen at the same time.

The term was coined by Fred Lakin, after Deutsch made the following comment at a talk on visual programming by Scott Kim and Warren Robinett: "Well, this is all fine and well, but the problem with visual programming languages is that you can't have more than 50 visual primitives on the screen at the same time. How are you going to write an operating system?"

The primitives in a visual language are the separate graphical elements used to build a program, and having more of them available at the same time enables the programmer to read more information. This limit is sometimes cited as an example of the advantage of textual over visual languages, pointing out the greater information density of text, and posing a difficulty in scaling the language.

However, criticisms of the limit include that it is not clear whether a similar limit also exists in textual programming languages; and that the limit could be overcome by applying modularity to visual programming as is commonly done in textual programming.

== See also ==
- Cognitive dimensions of notations
- Conway's law
