= The Hillside Group =

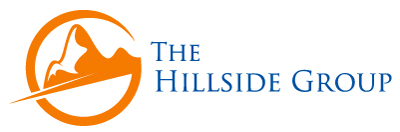
- Formation: 1993
- Members: 121
- Official language: English
- President: Joseph Yoder
- Website: www.hillside.net

The Hillside Group is an educational nonprofit organization founded in August 1993 to help software developers analyze and document common development and design problems as software design patterns. The Hillside Group supports the patterns community through sponsorship of the Pattern Languages of Programs conferences.

== History ==
In August 1993, Kent Beck and Grady Booch sponsored a mountain retreat in Colorado where a group converged on foundations for software patterns. Ward Cunningham, Ralph Johnson, Ken Auer, Hal Hildebrand, Grady Booch, Kent Beck, and Jim Coplien examined architect Christopher Alexander's work in pattern language and their own experiences as software developers to combine the concepts of objects and patterns and apply them to writing computer programs. The group agreed to build on Erich Gamma's study of object-oriented patterns, but to use patterns in a generative way in the sense that Alexander uses patterns for urban planning and architecture. They used the word generative to mean creational, to distinguish them from Gamma's patterns' that captured observations. The group was meeting on the side of a hill, which led them to name themselves the Hillside Group.

Since then, the Hillside Group has been incorporated as an educational non-profit organization. It sponsors and helps run Pattern Languages of Programs (PLoP) conferences such as PLoP, EuroPlop, ChiliPlop, GuruPLoP, Asian PLoP, Scrum PLoP, Viking PLoP and Sugarloaf PLoP. The Hillside Group has also worked on the Pattern Languages of Program Design series of books.

== Activities ==
The Hillside Group sponsors the Pattern Languages of Programs conferences in various countries, including the U.S., Brazil, Norway, Germany, Australia, and Japan. The Hillside Group assisted in publishing the Pattern Languages of Program Design book series until 2006. Since 2006, The Hillside Group has published patterns and conference proceedings through the Association for Computing Machinery (ACM) Digital Library.

== Patterns Library ==
The Hillside Patterns Library contains a comprehensive archive of patterns developed by the community, either directly or indirectly through the PLoP conferences.

== Conferences ==
The Hillside Group sponsors the conferences listed. The conferences focus on writing patterns, workshops, and invited talks related to pattern development. Most of the conferences are held annually and encourage attendees to submit papers pre-conference for inclusion in the writer's workshops. The papers undergo a shepherding process, where they are analyzed and evolved before conference attendance.

- PLoP: Pattern Languages of Programs
- ChiliPLoP: Southwestern Conference on Pattern Languages of Programs
- EuroPLoP: European Conference on Pattern Languages of Programs
- AsianPLoP: Japanese Conference on Pattern Languages of Programs
- SugarLoafPLoP: Latin American Conference on Pattern Languages of Programming
- VikingPLoP: Nordic Conference on Pattern Languages of Programs
- ScrumPLoP: Conference on Pattern Languages of Scrum
- EduPLoP: Educational Patterns Writing Workshop

== The Hillside Group Board ==
The President of The Hillside Group for 2010–2025 was Joseph Yoder of The Refactory, Inc.

The Hillside Group is led by a Board consisting of the President, Vice-President, Chief Operating Officer, Treasurer, two Directors, Secretary, two Editors in Chief and four Members.

== Current board ==
Position	Name
President	Joseph Yoder
Vice-President	Ademar Aguiar
Treasurer	Rebecca Wirfs-Brock
Directors	Richard P. Gabriel and Neil Harrison
Secretary	Lise B. Hvatum
Editors in Chief	James Noble and Ralph Johnson
Members	Bob Hanmer, Robert Biddle, Christian Kohls, and Christian Köppe
Emeritus Members	Grady Booch, Linda Rising and Dirk Riehle
