= Pusar =

Pusar پوسار
- Village
- Location within Iran
- Coordinates: 27°34′52″N 61°00′00″E
- Country: Iran
- Province: Sistan and Baluchestan
- County: Khash
- Bakhsh: Irandegan
- Rural District: Irandegan

Population (2006)
  - Total: 56
- Time zone: UTC+3:30 (IRST)
  - Summer (DST): UTC+4:30 (IRDT)

Pusar (Persian: پوسار, also Romanized as Pūsār; also known as Posa) is a village in Irandegan Rural District, Irandegan District, Khash County, Sistan and Baluchestan Province, Iran. At the 2006 census, its population was 56, in 16 families.
