= Thomas R. G. Green =

British cognitive scientist

Thomas R. G. Green (born 19 December 1941) is a British cognitive scientist, and Visiting Professor at the University of York, known for his contribution to cognitive modelling and the development of the concept of cognitive dimensions of notations.

In the 1980s Green was working for MRC Applied Psychology Unit in Cambridge, and became reader in computing at the Open University. In 2015 he is Visiting Professor at the Department of Computer Science of the University of York, and is affiliated with the Department of Computer Science of the University of Leeds.

His research interests reaches from "Programming language design and cognitive psychology", "Interaction as an action language", and "Cognitive dimensions of notations and devices" to "Models of information artifacts" and "Virtual devices as research tools."

== Selected publications ==
- Thomas R. G. Green, Stephen J. Payne. The Psychology of computer use, Academic Press, 1983.
- Benyon, David, and Thomas Green. Conceptual modeling for user interface development. Springer-Verlag New York, Inc., 1998.

Articles, a selection:

- Payne, Stephen J., and Thomas RG Green. "Task-action grammars: A model of the mental representation of task languages." Human-computer interaction 2.2 (1986): 93-133.
- Green, Thomas RG. "Cognitive dimensions of notations." in: A. Sutcliffe and Macaulay, (eds.), People and Computers V (1989): 443–460.
- Green, Thomas RG, Marian Petre, and R. K. E. Bellamy. "Comprehensibility of visual and textual programs: A test of superlativism against the’match-mismatch’conjecture." ESP 91.743 (1991): 121–146.
- Green, Thomas RG, and Marian Petre. "When visual programs are harder to read than textual programs." Human-Computer Interaction: Tasks and Organisation, Proceedings of ECCE-6 (6th European Conference on Cognitive Ergonomics). GC van der Veer, MJ Tauber, S. Bagnarola and M. Antavolits. Rome, CUD. 1992.
- Green, Thomas R. G., and Marian Petre. "Usability analysis of visual programming environments: a ‘cognitive dimensions’ framework." Journal of Visual Languages & Computing 7.2 (1996): 131–174.
