= Ronsberg =

- Municipality
- Coat of arms

- Location of Ronsberg within Ostallgäu district
- Interactive map of Ronsberg
- Location within Germany Location within Bavaria
- Coordinates: 47°54′N 10°26′E
- Country: Germany
- State: Bavaria
- Admin. region: Schwaben
- District: Ostallgäu

Government
  - Mayor (2020–26): Michael Sturm

Area
  - Total: 16.52 km^{2} (6.38 sq mi)
- Elevation: 701 m (2,300 ft)

Population (2025-12-31)
  - Total: 1,631
  - Density: 98.73/km^{2} (255.7/sq mi)
- Time zone: UTC+01:00 (CET)
  - Summer (DST): UTC+02:00 (CEST)
- Postal codes: 87671
- Dialling codes: 08306
- Vehicle registration: OAL
- Website: www.ronsberg.de

Ronsberg (German pronunciation: [ˈʁɔnsbɛʁk]) is a municipality in the district of Ostallgäu in Bavaria in Germany.
