= Kevlin Henney =

Author, presenter, and consultant on software development

Kevlin Henney is an English author, presenter, and consultant on software development. He has written on the subject of computer programming and development practice for many magazines and sites, including Better Software, The Register, C/C++ Users Journal, Application Development Advisor, JavaSpektrum, C++ Report, Java Report, EXE, and Overload. He is a member of the IEEE Software Advisory Board. Henney is also coauthor of books on patterns and editor of 97 Things Every Programmer Should Know.

Henney has given keynote addresses at a number of conferences, including Agile, ACCU, DevTernity, DevWeek, Dutch PHP Conference, Embedded Systems Club, GeeCON, GOTO, Build Stuff, JAOO, JAZOON, Jfokus, NLUUG, OOP, PHPNW, SDC, Software Architect, VOXXEDDAYS, and XP Day.

Henney is a member of the ACCU, and gave the keynote address at the 2001 ACCU conference on the subject of writing less code, because "there is no code faster than no code" and "less code, equals less bugs" (of which he is an active presenter). He is also a speaker at OOPSLA, most recently speaking at OOPSLA 2005. In October 2009, Henney presented The Uncertainty Principle at the 2nd Annual PHP North West Conference in Manchester, UK. He has also been credited with the remark "...except for the problem of too many layers of indirection" in response to the famous aphorism that "All problems in computer science can be solved by another level of indirection."

== Bibliography ==
- Frank Buschmann; Kevlin Henney; Douglas C. Schmidt (2007). Pattern-Oriented Software Architecture, Volume 4: A Pattern Language for Distributed Computing. John Wiley & Sons. ISBN 978-0-470-05902-9.
- Frank Buschmann; Kevlin Henney; Douglas C. Schmidt (2007). Pattern-Oriented Software Architecture, Volume 5: On Patterns and Pattern Languages. John Wiley & Sons. ISBN 978-0-471-48648-0.
- Kevlin Henney, ed. (2010). 97 Things Every Programmer Should Know. O'Reilly Media. ISBN 978-0-596-80948-5.
- Richard Monson-Haefel, ed. (2009). 97 Things Every Software Architect Should Know. O'Reilly Media. ISBN 978-0-596-52269-8.
- Kevlin Henney, ed. (2017). 97 Things Every Java Programmer Should Know. O'Reilly Media. ISBN 978-1-4919-5269-6.
