= Poza de la Vega =

Coordinates: 42°35′N 4°48′W

- municipality
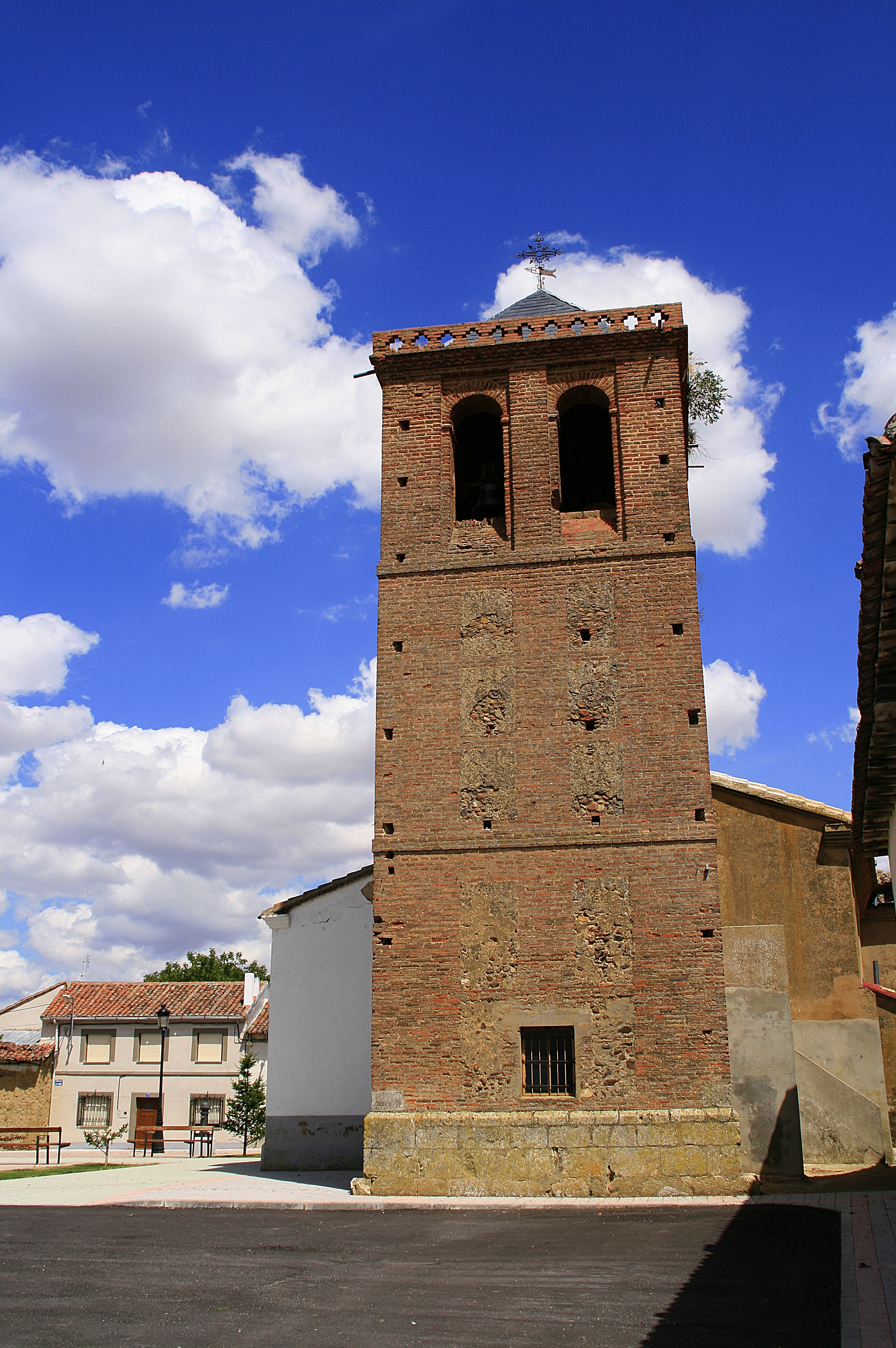
- Interactive map of Poza de la Vega
- Country: Spain
- Autonomous community: Castile and León
- Province: Palencia

Area
  - Total: 24 km^{2} (9.3 sq mi)

Population (2025-01-01)
  - Total: 160
  - Density: 6.7/km^{2} (17/sq mi)
- Time zone: UTC+1 (CET)
  - Summer (DST): UTC+2 (CEST)
- Website: Official website

Poza de la Vega is a municipality located in the province of Palencia, Castile and León, Spain. According to the 2018 census (INE), the municipality has a population of 184 inhabitants.
