= Douglas C. Schmidt =

American computer scientist

Douglas C. Schmidt (born July 18, 1962) is a computer scientist and author in the fields of object-oriented programming, reactive programming, distributed computing, design patterns and generative AI. He is the inaugural Dean of the School of Computing, Data Sciences & Physics at William & Mary.

== Biography ==
In August 1994 he joined the faculty of Washington University in St. Louis. From August 1999 to December 2002 he was associate professor with tenure at the University of California, Irvine. During much of this time he worked for DARPA managing US federal funded research programs. In 2003 he became professor of computer Science at Vanderbilt University, and associate chair of computer science and engineering in December 2004. In August 2010 he became a deputy director, research, and chief technology officer at Software Engineering Institute. In April 2013 he became a director at Real-Time Innovations. In January 2025 he became the inaugural Dean of the School of Computing, Data Sciences & Physics at William & Mary.

He led teams that developed an Adaptive Communication Environment (ACE), The ACE ORB (TAO), a component-integrated ACE ORB (CIAO), and an implementation of the Deployment and Configuration standard built on top of TAO (DAnCE). "ORB" refers to a key piece of the Common Object Request Broker Architecture. They were made available as open-source software.

On February 8, 2024, Schmidt was approved by the U.S. Senate Armed Services Committee to become the Director, Operational Test and Evaluation for the Department of Defense. He was confirmed by the full Senate on February 29, 2024.

== Publications ==
=== Articles ===
Douglas C. Schmidt published articles in C++ Report and C/C++ Users Journal. He edited "Object Interconnections" column in C/C++ Users Journal, and "Patterns++" column in C++ Report.

=== Books ===
- James. O. Coplien, Douglas C. Schmidt (May 1995). Pattern Languages of Program Design. Addison-Wesley. ISBN 978-0-201-60734-5.
- Douglas Schmidt, Michael Stal, Hans Rohnert, Frank Buschmann (September 2000). Pattern-Oriented Software Architecture Volume 2: Patterns for Concurrent and Networked Objects. Wiley. ISBN 978-0-471-60695-6.
- Douglas C. Schmidt; Stephen D. Huston (December 2001). C++ Network Programming, Volume I: Mastering Complexity with ACE and Patterns. ISBN 978-0-201-60464-1.
- Douglas C. Schmidt; Stephen D. Huston (November 2002). C++ Network Programming, Volume 2: Systematic Reuse with ACE and Frameworks. Addison-Wesley. ISBN 978-0-201-79525-7.
- Endler, Markus; Schmidt, Douglas, eds. (August 2003). Middleware 2003: ACM/IFIP/USENIX International Middleware Conference, Rio de Janeiro, Brazil, June 16–20, 2003, Proceedings (Lecture Notes in Computer Science). Springer. ISBN 978-3-540-40317-3.
- Meersman, Robert; Tari, Zahir; Schmidt, Douglas C., eds. (January 2004). Building Application Frameworks: Object-Oriented Foundations of Framework Design On The Move to Meaningful Internet Systems 2003: CoopIS, DOA, and ODBASE: OTM Confederated International Conferences, CoopIS, DOA, and ODBASE 2003, Catania, … 2003 (Lecture Notes in Computer Science). Springer. ISBN 978-3-540-20498-5.
- Frank Buschmann, Kevlin Henney, Douglas C. Schmidt (March 2007). Pattern-Oriented Software Architecture: A Pattern Language for Distributed Computing, Volume 4. John Wiley & Sons. ISBN 978-0-470-05902-9.
- Frank Buschmann; Kevlin Henney; Douglas C. Schmidt (June 2007). Pattern Oriented Software Architecture Volume 5: On Patterns and Pattern Languages. Wiley. ISBN 978-0-471-48648-0.
- Engels, Gregor; Opdyke, Bill; Schmidt, Douglas C.; Weil, Frank, eds. (October 2007). Model Driven Engineering Languages and Systems: 10th International Conference, MoDELS 2007, Nashville, USA, September 30 – October 5, 2007, Proceedings … / Programming and Software Engineering). Springer. ISBN 978-3-540-75208-0.
- Mohamed E. Fayad; Douglas C. Schmidt; Ralph Johnson (September 2009). Implementing Application Frameworks: Object-Oriented Frameworks at Work. Wiley. ISBN 978-0-471-25201-6.
- Mohamed E. Fayad; Douglas C. Schmidt; Ralph Johnson (September 2009). Building Application Frameworks: Object-Oriented Foundations of Framework Design. Wiley. ISBN 978-0-471-24875-0.
