= Poša =

- Municipality
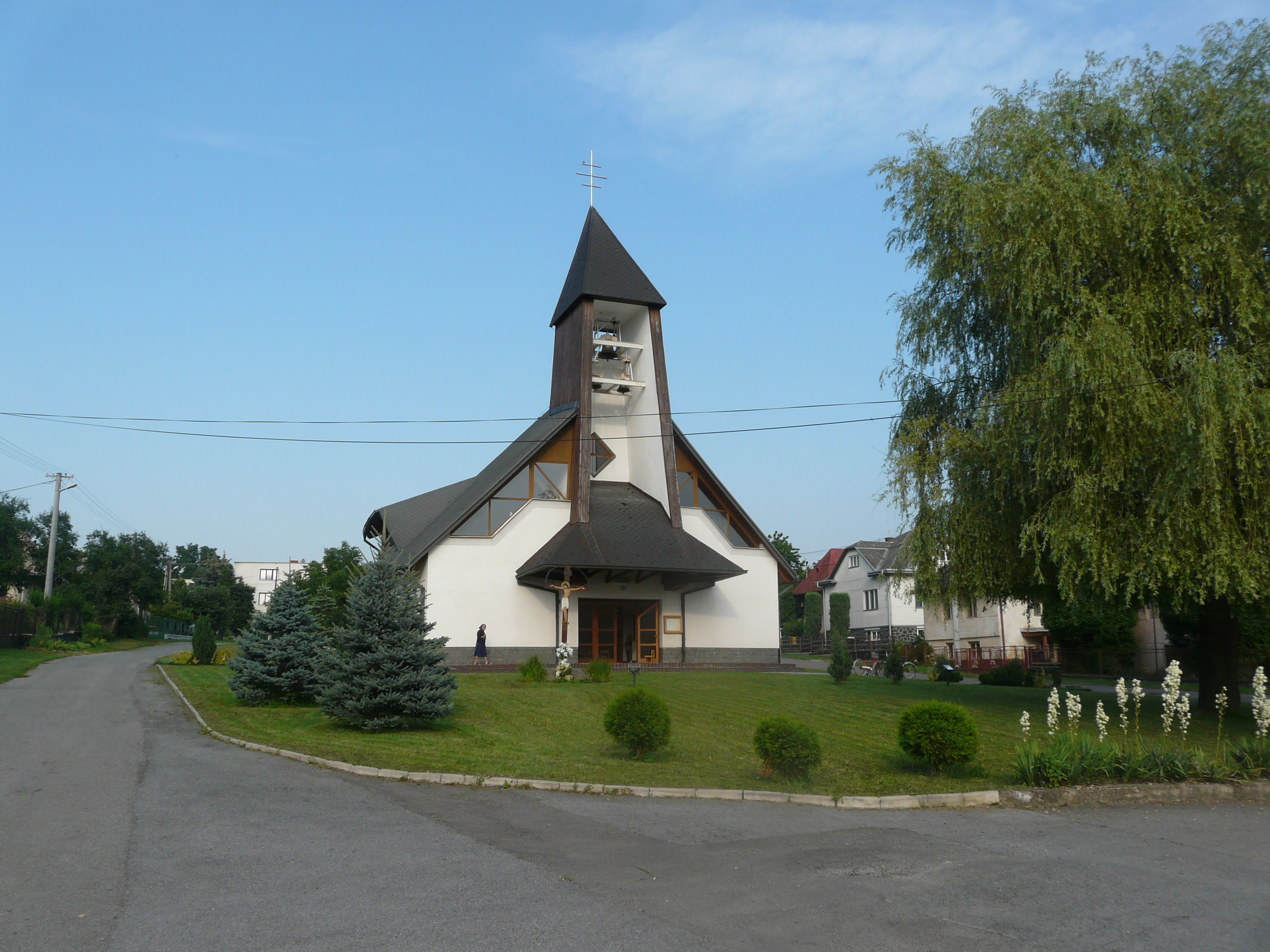

- Flag

- Location of Poša in the Prešov Region Location of Poša in Slovakia
- Coordinates: 48.83°N 21.77°E
- Country: Slovakia
- Region: Prešov Region
- District: Vranov nad Topľou District
- First mentioned: 1386

Area
  - Total: 8.43 km^{2} (3.25 sq mi)
- Elevation: 119 m (390 ft)

Population (2025)
  - Total: 1,022
- Time zone: UTC+1 (CET)
  - Summer (DST): UTC+2 (CEST)
- Postal code: 942 1
- Area code: +421 57
- Vehicle registration plate (until 2022): VT
- Website: www.posa.sk

Poša (Hungarian: Pósa) is a village and municipality in Vranov nad Topľou District in the Prešov Region of eastern Slovakia.

== History ==
In historical records the village was first mentioned in 1386.

== Geography ==
The municipality lies at an altitude of 119 metres (390 ft) and covers an area of 8.43 km^{2} (3.25 sq mi) (2025).

== Population ==
Population statistic (10 years)
Year	1995	2005	2015	2025
Count	763	839	945	1022
Difference		+9.96%	+12.63%	+8.14%

Population statistic
Year	2024	2025
Count	1010	1022
Difference		+1.18%

It has a population of 1022 people (31 December 2025).

=== Ethnicity ===
Census 2021 (1+ %)
Ethnicity	Number	Fraction
Slovak	907	96.38%
Romani	362	38.46%
Not found out	53	5.63%
Total	941	

In year 2021 was 941 people by ethnicity 907 as Slovak, 362 as Romani, 53 as Not found out, 4 as Czech, 2 as Russian, 1 as Ukrainian, 1 as Rusyn and 1 as Canadian.

Note on population: The difference values of population numbers in the table "Population statistic" and in the sections "Ethnicity" & "Religion" is caused by the use of various statistical methods.

=== Religion ===
Census 2021 (1+ %)
Religion	Number	Fraction
Greek Catholic Church	654	69.5%
Roman Catholic Church	210	22.32%
Not found out	30	3.19%
None	29	3.08%
Total	941	

In year 2021 was 941 people by religion 654 from Greek Catholic Church, 210 from Roman Catholic Church, 30 from Not found out, 29 from None, 6 from Apostolic Church, 5 from Evangelical Church, 4 from Christian Congregations in Slovakia and 3 from Seventh-day Adventist Church.
