= Aktion Brandt =

Nazi murders of sick people in sanatoriums

Aktion Brandt (Operation Brandt) is an umbrella term for the decentralized murders of sick people in sanatoriums in Nazi Germany. In some institutions, sick people were deliberately subjected to overcrowding, neglect, and malnutrition; in other institutions, the transferred inmates were murdered on a large scale. The action, named after Hitler's doctor and general commissioner for medical and health services Karl Brandt, partially succeeded Aktion T4.
