= Scott Meyers =

American computer programmer

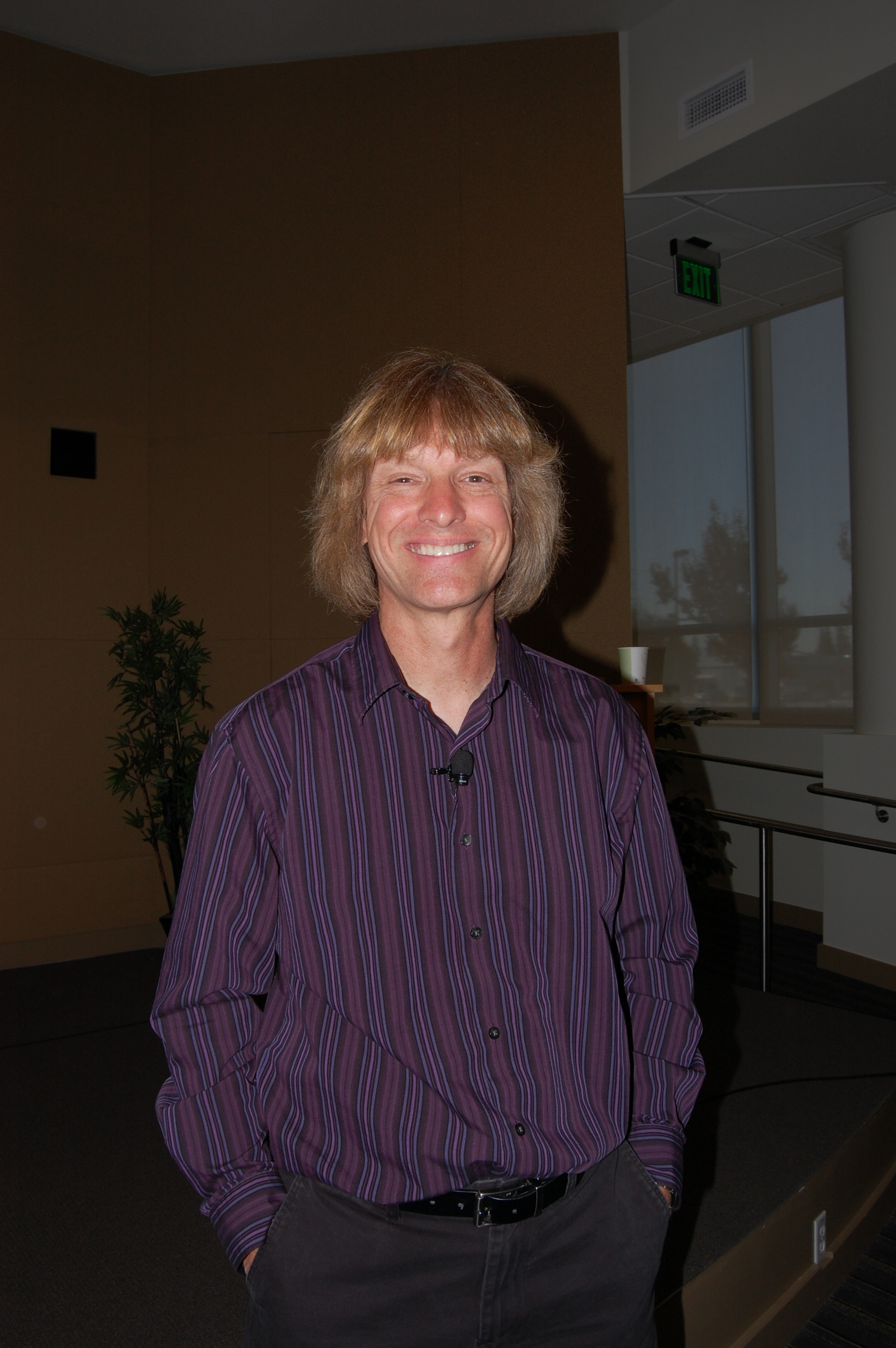
- Meyers in 2013
- Born: April 9, 1959 (age 67)
- Education: Stanford University (M.Sc), Brown University (PhD)
- Known for: Effective Software Development Series

Scott Douglas Meyers (born April 9, 1959) is an American author and software consultant, specializing in the C++ computer programming language. He is known for his Effective C++ book series. During his career, he was a frequent speaker at conferences and trade shows.

== Biography ==
He holds a Ph.D. in computer science from Brown University and an M.S. in computer science from Stanford University. He conceived and, with Herb Sutter, Andrei Alexandrescu, Dan Saks, and Steve Dewhurst, co-organized and presented the boutique (limited-attendance) conference, The C++ Seminar, which took place three times in 2001-2002. He also conceived and, with Sutter and Alexandrescu, co-organized and presented another boutique conference, C++ and Beyond annually in 2010-2014. One implementation of the lazily instantiated singleton pattern, is commonly called the "Meyers singleton" due to his popularization of this implementation.

Meyers has expressed opposition to asking programmers to solve design or programming problems during job interviews:

"I hate anything that asks me to design on the spot. That's asking to demonstrate a skill rarely required on the job in a high-stress environment, where it is difficult for a candidate to accurately prove their abilities. I think it's fundamentally an unfair thing to request of a candidate."

In December 2015, Meyers announced his retirement from the world of C++.

== Publications ==
- 1992. Effective C++: 50 Specific Ways to Improve Your Programs and Designs. ISBN 0-201-56364-9
- 1995. More Effective C++: 35 New Ways to Improve Your Programs and Designs. ISBN 0-201-63371-X
- 1998. Effective C++, Second Edition: 50 Specific Ways to Improve Your Programs and Designs. ISBN 0-201-92488-9
- 2001. Effective STL: 50 Specific Ways to Improve Your Use of the Standard Template Library. ISBN 0-201-74962-9
- 2005. Effective C++, Third Edition: 55 Specific Ways to Improve Your Programs and Designs. ISBN 0-321-33487-6
- 2010. Overview of The New C++ (C++11). Annotated training materials published by Artima Press. No ISBN.
- 2010. Effective C++ in an Embedded Environment. Annotated training materials published by Artima Press. No ISBN.
- 2014. Effective Modern C++: 42 Specific Ways to Improve Your Use of C++11 and C++14. ISBN 1-491-90399-6

== Awards and achievements ==
Meyers is known for his popular Effective C++ Software Development books.

In March 2009, Meyers was awarded the 2009 Dr. Dobb's Excellence in Programming Award.
