= ACCU (organisation) =

ACCU, previously known as the Association of C and C++ Users, is a non-profit user group of people interested in software development, dedicated to raising the standard of computer programming. The ACCU publishes two journals and organizes an annual conference.

== History ==
ACCU was formed in 1987 by Martin Houston. The original name of the organisation was C Users' Group (UK) and this remained the formal name of the organisation until 2011, although it adopted the public name Association of C and C++ Users for the period 1993–2003, and adopted the shorter form ACCU from 2003 onward. As the formal name suggests, the organisation was originally created for people in the United Kingdom. However, the membership is worldwide, predominantly European and North American, but also with members from central and southern America, Australasia, Africa and Asia. Originally, the voluntary association was mainly for C programmers, but it has expanded over time to include all programming languages, especially C++, C#, Java, Perl and Python.

== Publications ==
The ACCU currently publishes two journals:

- C Vu is a members-only journal which acts as the association's newsletter and carries book reviews, articles on software development and a number of regular columns such as Student Code Critique and Professionalism in Programming. It was edited by Phil Stubbington from its first issue until 1991.
- Overload aims to carry more in-depth articles aimed at professional software developers. Topics range from programming and design through to process and management. Overload is available online to members and non-members free of charge.

Other journals have been published by ACCU in the past. Accent was the news letter of the Silicon Valley chapter and CAUGers was the news letter of the Acorn special interest group. Overload was originally the journal of ACCU's C++ special interest group, but is no longer language-specific.

== Local groups ==
The Silicon Valley chapter organized local meetings in San Jose. Local groups were formed in London, Bristol & Bath, Oxford, Cambridge, North East England, Southern England, York and Zurich.

== Conference ==
The ACCU is operated by a volunteer committee, elected at an Annual General Meeting during the annual conference each Spring which from 1997 to 2012 took place in Oxford, and for the first time in Bristol in 2013. It attracts speakers from the computing community including David Abrahams, Andrei Alexandrescu, Ross J. Anderson, James Coplien, Tom Gilb, Kevlin Henney, Andrew Koenig, Simon Peyton-Jones, Eric S. Raymond, Guido van Rossum, Greg Stein, Bjarne Stroustrup (the designer and original implementor of C++), Herb Sutter and Daveed Vandevoorde.

The UK Python Conference, for the Python programming language, originally started out as a track at the ACCU conference.

== Standardisation ==
ACCU supports the standardisation process for computer programming languages. ACCU provided financial sponsorship of meetings in the UK for both the International Organization for Standardization (ISO) C programming language working group and the ISO C++ working groups and helped finance travel to ECMA meetings in mainland Europe.

== Mailing lists ==
The ACCU operates mailing lists, some of which are also open to non-members. These lists allow for general programming-orientated discussions, but also for mentored discussions. Mentored groups have included Effective C++, Python, software patterns, functional programming and XML. They are often based around study of a book.
