= C/C++ Users Journal =

Computer magazine

C/C++ Users Journal was a computer magazine dedicated to the C and C++ programming languages published in the United States from 1985 to 2006. It was one of the last printed magazines to cover specifically this topic (apart from ACCU's journals, which continue as printed magazines). It was based in Lawrence, Kansas.

== History ==
The magazine started as a 16-page quarterly newsletter named BDS C Users' Group, and its target was users of Leor Zolman's BDS C compiler. Robert Ward was the volunteer coordinator of the C Users Group, which had some 150 members. The first issue of BDS C Users's Group was published on June 15, 1981. In December 1982, the name was changed to C User's Group Newsletter.

In April 1985, the first issue of a new quarterly magazine, The C Journal, was published by InfoPro Systems under the leadership of David Fiedler. Its editor in chief was Rex Jaeschke, a member of the ANSI X3J11 C Language Standard Committee.

In 1987/1988, the C User's Group Newsletter and The C Journal merged into one journal named C Users Journal. It was published by R & D Publications Inc. eight times a year with P.J. Plauger as editor. The journal had 6800 subscribers and 3000 newsstand readers.

In July 1994, the name was changed to C/C++ Users Journal. The magazine was published by CMP Media LLC . Its editor was P.J. Plauger.

In November 2001, the C/C++ Users Journal celebrated its 20th anniversary. It was published monthly at the time, had more than 43,000 readers worldwide, and contained a bimonthly Java supplement called "Java Solutions".

The magazine was discontinued in 2006 with the February issue carrying a cover letter from CMP Media informing readers that no subsequent issues would be published. The publishers offered to refund remaining subscriptions or to roll them over to another magazine, Dr. Dobb's Journal. The cover letter stated that Dr Dobb's Journal would now "feature expanded C and C++ coverage". In 2009, Dr Dobb's Journal was itself discontinued as a standalone publication and merged with InformationWeek magazine.

Past articles and source code archives for C/C++ Users Journal are still available through the Dr Dobb's Journal website.

== See also ==
- Defunct computer magazines
