= Micronet 800 =

1980s online magazine on Prestel

- Micronet 800 logo
- Developer: Telemap; Prism Microproducts; ECC Publications
- Key people: Richard Hease; Bob Denton; David Babsky
- Type: Information and services provider on Prestel videotex service
- Launched: March 1983; 43 years ago
- Discontinued: October 1991; 34 years ago
- Status: Discontinued
- Members: c. 25,000 at peak (Note: The figure reported when Micronet was relaunched in mid-1988.)
- Pricing model: Subscription (quarterly) and usage (time spent on system, some telesoftware, some messaging service actions)
- Availability: Closed user group

Micronet 800 was a provider of information and communication services hosted on Prestel, a British videotex service, from 1983 to 1991. It targeted the UK home computer market and operated as an online, subscription-based magazine and database. Subscribers also received Log On, a print quarterly.

Micronet 800 offered computer-related news, reviews of hardware, software, and video games, access to turn-based and real-time multiplayer games (MUDs), downloadable telesoftware, chatrooms and bulletin boards, business and personal finance advice, and email, telex, and other forms of messaging. In addition, a group, club, or individual could rent space on the database.

A subscriber connected to Micronet 800 via the Prestel network using an ordinary phoneline (typically at local call rates) (Note: 62% of phone subscribers could access Prestel at local call rates when Micronet 800 launched in March 1983. This rose to 94% in April 1984, and to 98% in February 1986.) and a microcomputer equipped with a modem. (Note: A dedicated terminal or an adapted TV set with a keypad or keyboard could also be used to connect to Prestel.) If their microcomputer had not been set up to access Micronet's home page automatically, they entered *800# to do so.

== History ==
=== Origin ===
Micronet 800 stemmed from the development by Bob Denton, in 1980 and 1981, of Electronic Insight, a features and price-comparison site on Prestel listing computers, calculators and other electronic and IT products. Its entry-point was page 800.

In 1982, Electronic Insight was acquired by Telemap, the videotex arm of EMAP (East Midland Allied Press), on the recommendation of Richard Hease, the owner of ECC Publications: EMAP had just bought several computer magazines from him.

Telemap, formed in 1981, was at that time an information provider on Prestel. EMAP asked Hease to look into the future viability of Telemap's Prestel presence. In Hease's words, "I thought the only way Prestel was going to work was to make it possible to link micros into it and develop a database micro users would want." In autumn 1982, Hease and Denton negotiated a deal with British Telecom that provided substantial investment and positioned Micronet 800 as a key part of a new plan by Prestel for attracting residential users. The Department of Trade and Industry provided additional financial backing. The arrangement included the free installation for subscribers of a phone jack-socket in which to plug a modem.

=== Development ===
Telemap was responsible for Micronet 800 and the editorial development of the site.

Prism Microproducts (Note: The distributor of Sinclair Computers in the UK.) developed the modems needed to make Micronet 800 pages accessible by a variety of home computers. These included the Apple II, ZX81, BBC Micro, Dragon 32/64, IBM PC, PET, ZX Spectrum, Sinclair QL, Lynx, VIC-20, and Commodore 64. Prism's modems ranged from a simple acoustic coupler to integrated network interface controllers, and included the VTX 5000, custom-designed for the ZX Spectrum.

From 1985, prospective Micronet subscribers were sent a list of other modem suppliers. That same year, Prism went into receivership and Telemap purchased their modem stock. In 1986, in a bid to increase take-up, Micronet 800 offered a free modem to new users subscribing for a year.

=== Growth ===
In March 1983, at the launch of the service, the first subscriber was Jeremy Dredge, an estate agent. There were over 2000 subscriptions during the first two months of Micronet 800, rising to over 4000 by October.

Just over a year later, in November 1984, the figure had grown to more than 9000, with subscribers to Micronet accounting for nearly 60% of Prestel's residential users. Franchises to run Micronet were given to the Hong Kong Telephone Company and the Swedish PTT. The Micronet news editor stated that in December that year, 1.1 million accesses per week were made to the Micronet database.

By January 1986, there were 18,000 subscribers, with 20,000 declared in an advertisement by Micronet published in July that same year. 25,000 subscribers and a database of 35,000 pages were reported when Micronet was relaunched under new management in mid-1988.

Looking back some decades later, David Babsky, Micronet 800's founding editor, observed that:

What we found was that there was a high churn rate ... So we kept getting lots of new people, but at the same time about a third of the people we had disappeared.

=== Incorporation in Prestel Microcomputing ===
In May 1984, as one of several specialised services launched on Prestel at the time, British Telecom set up Prestel Microcomputing. This incorporated services from Micronet 800 and the information providers Viewfax 258 (a magazine similar in scope to Micronet 800) and Clubspot 810 (run by ACC, the Association of Amateur Computer Clubs).

=== Acquisition by British Telecom ===
In 1985, Bell Canada bought a 20% share in Telemap, and British Telecom acquired a 25% stake. British Telecom became the majority shareholder in 1987, initially managing the company as part of BT Spectrum, its Value Added Services Group, before transferring it to BT Prestel. In 1989, British Telecom acquired the entire company. It moved it to Dialcom House in Apsley, near Hemel Hempstead, and folded the business first into the Dialcom Group (along with BT Prestel and Telecom Gold), and then into BT Managed Network Services.

=== Closure ===
British Telecom closed Micronet 800 on 31 October 1991. A letter to members stated that "With over 10,000 members, Micronet is easily the largest online service in the UK specialising in microcomputing. However, it is still not large enough to enable us to maintain a cost-effective service and provide the extra facilities requested by our customers." The figure of 10,000 was less than 10% of what was predicted shortly after launch. The letter included a free introductory membership to CompuServe, suggested as "[An] excellent alternative to the many products and services provided by Micronet."

Membership had decreased from a peak of around 25,000. The Guardian attributed the decline to the introduction in mid-1988 of an off-peak Prestel time-charge discouraging the use of the "Chatlines" service. The Times agreed, and also pointed to a steep rise in subscription charges, opining that "BT's failure to provide even this committed group with an economic ... service means that Prestel is destined ... for businesses."

== Services provided ==
Printed on Micronet 800 headed paper, this page from the science fiction section of the database shows an entry to a story competition, c. 1985

=== Directories and guides ===
Micronet 800 had an A–Z online index, published a directory in its Log On print magazine, and distributed a guide for users containing a London Tube-style map of the database.

=== Chatlines ===
A form of chat room, Chatlines began in late 1984 as a single online chat service where users could post messages that other users could read and respond to. It was described in the vocabulary of the time as a "Citizens' Band (CB) emulator". A year later, Chatlines was divided into six special-interest sections and moved to a mainframe computer.

By 1986, eight Chatlines were available: two so-called "Daisychats", each composed of a continuous loop of linked videotex frames where, once full, the newest posting overwrote the oldest; and six online forums, where postings were archived. The forums, known as "lines", included ones for politics and religion (the latter was monitored), "Gay Chatline", and a weekly "Celebrity Chatline" (launched in 1985), which operated like a phone-in – users posted questions to a celebrity, (Note: Those interviewed included Clive Sinclair, Cynthia Payne, Douglas Adams, Fatima Whitbread, Feargal Sharkey, Lord Cardigan, and Terry Pratchett.) who would answer them during an interview by a Micronet editor.

In June 1990, British Telecom suspended Chatlines. Micronet stated that sporadic monitoring had not prevented abuse of the service, and that it would investigate how to operate Chatlines in a "fully monitored" way in future, though without committing to a reinstatement. In the event, Chatlines did not return. A year later, Micronet introduced a moderated "Line Noise" forum.

=== Teleconferencing ===
DialTalk (briefly "TeleTalk"), a teleconferencing service, opened in 1988. A user could hold live conferences or discussions with up to sixty-three other users in one of 30 "rooms", and convene breakaway or private meetings in other vacant rooms.

=== Downloadable software ===
In return for a fee or royalties, Micronet 800 encouraged individuals, amateur computer groups and software companies to supply programs that could be stored on Micronet's 800 telesoftware database and downloaded by subscribers.

Originally, about half of the programs were free, with the rest available at discounts of around 15% or more. In early 1989, however, Micronet abandoned paid-for telesoftware and began supplying programs free of charge via a Prestel gateway. Microcomputers for which programs were made available included the Amiga, Amstrad CPC, BBC Micro, IBM PC, and Spectrum.

When Micronet 800 launched in 1983, providers of programs on Prestel were using a protocol drawn up by the UK's Council for Educational Technology (CET) after consulting British Telecom, microcomputer manufacturers, users, and educational software agencies. (Note: Several formats for telesoftware downloadable from Prestel and Prestel-compatible videotex systems were trialled in the early 1980s.) In early 1991, Micronet issued FCET, a revised version of the CET format, that much decreased download times.

Micro Arts, creators of computer art in text and graphic form, published articles and downloadable programs on Micronet 800 from 1985 onwards.

=== Games ===
The longest-running online game on Micronet 800 was Starnet, a turn-based game, with players sending in moves (Note: Using a "response frame", a preformatted Prestel message page.) that would be executed once a day. Micronet 800 also hosted Shades, one of the first real-time multiplayer games. Other multiplayer games offered included The Round Britain Yacht Race, Trash ("The game puts you in the role of a pan-dimensional dustman"), and Casino, which featured simulations of slot machines and games such as roulette, blackjack, keno, baccarat, and poker.

=== Email ===
Each Prestel user had a unique Mailbox number – usually derived from the last nine digits of their phone number – that was used to address and send messages to others on Prestel. Reportedly, Micronet 800 subscribers were particularly enthusiastic about the medium, sending twice as many Mailbox messages as regular Prestel users.

In 1984, Mailbox was connected to the telex system via Prestel's Telex Link: telexes could be sent and received like standard messages. From mid-1987, Micronet's "Interlink" facility offered subscribers direct access to the Telecom Gold email, chat, and information service.

=== Magazines ===
Micronet created separate online magazines – "micromags" – for owners of a range of popular home computers, (Note: In Spring 1989, Micronet listed these as Spectrum (with a new edition issued each Monday), PC & Compatibles (Tuesday), Commodore 64/128 (Wednesday), Atari ST (Thursday), Commodore Amiga (Thursday), Amstrad CPC (Friday), and BBC Micro (Friday).) adapting its offering according to levels of ownership of particular models and market developments.

Bizznet, the first non-microcomputer section in Micronet's database, launched in 1986 with guidance for small businesses on accounting, law, tax, insurance, and finance. In 1988, it was renamed Money Xtra and refocused on personal finance, providing consumer, financial, and tax advice, together with a legal advisory service.

Xtra!, described as a leisure magazine, also began in 1986, and contained music reviews, analysis of current affairs, restaurant and bar reviews, and letters from users. Separate sections covered TV and radio (Waveguide), and consumer electronics (Voltage).

Computers, music, and MIDI-music were the subject of MidiSpot, which incorporated Micronet's earlier Music City magazine, launched in 1988.

=== Gallery ===
This was an area of the database where, for a fee, users could rent pages and publish anything they wished, subject to monitoring by Micronet for instances of libel or obscenity.

== Personnel ==
Management
Richard Hease (co-founder 1982–1983) – Bob Denton (co-founder 1982–1983) – Tim Schoonmaker (managing director 1983–1986) – Tom Baird (managing director 1987) – John Tomany (managing director 1988–1990) – Michael Weatherseed (general manager 1990–1991).

Editors
David Babsky (founding editor) – Simon D'Arcy (later, publisher) – Sid Smith – Francis Jago (managing editor) – Paul Needs – Ian Burley – Barbara Conway.

Other editorial staff
Ken Young (journalist) – Adam Denning (technical editor) – David Rosenbaum (news and music editor) – Chris Bourne (Sunday Xtra editor) – Paul Vigay (Acorn editor) – Chris Lewis (Sinclair editor) – Rupert Goodwins (editorial assistant) – Afshin Rattansi (music and arts journalist) – David Farmbrough (music journalist).

Production
Robin Wilkinson (software manager) – Val Burgess (telesoftware database manager) – Mike Brown (technical manager) – Richard Tyner (software sales and acquisition) – John Mason (software testing and pricing) – John Prout (technical helpdesk) – Denise Shemuel (editorial database manager) – Colin Morgan – Roger Cracknell – Gary Smith – Robert O'Donnell – Patrick Reilly – Daemonn Brody – Denise Slater (graphics designer, telesoftware pages) – Anna Smith (editorial graphics designer) – Sharon Giles.

Marketing
Ian Rock (marketing manager) – Peter Probert (public relations manager) – Phil Godsell (product manager) – Lynne Thomas (promotions manager) – Claire Walker (advertising and public relations executive) – Lynne Bennett (marketing executive).

Other contributors
Steve Gold – Robert Schifreen – David Janda – Richard Poynder, Bizznet editor.

In the run-up to Micronet 800's launch in March 1983, staff worked out of EMAP's offices in Hatton Garden in London. Subsequently, editorial staff were based in London's Clerkenwell. Technical staff were first based in Peterborough.

=== Quotes ===
"The thing that inspired me most was looking at the Gutenberg Bible, the first book to be printed using moveable type. Micronet is to communication in the 80s what that Bible was to the Middle Ages." – David Babsky (1984), Micronet 800 founding editor.

"Long term, I see being able to program your computer with various names of journalists you particularly like, various sports that you have a habit of looking at, and being able to program your computer at 4 o'clock or 5 o'clock in the morning to log on to Prestel Micronet and then download very rapidly information which will then be printed out. So instead of sitting on the train in the morning with your Times, Guardian, Telegraph, or whatever, you will have a printout with all your favourite journalists, your sports pages, cartoons ... you can make up your own newspaper." – Simon D'Arcy (1986), Micronet 800 publisher.

== See also ==
- Email – Mail sent using electronic means
- Home computer – Class of microcomputers
- Online game – Video game played over the Internet
- Prestel – British videotex service
- Telesoftware – Transmission of software via teletext
- Viewdata – Information retrieval service and legacy system
