= Computergram International =

British technology news publication

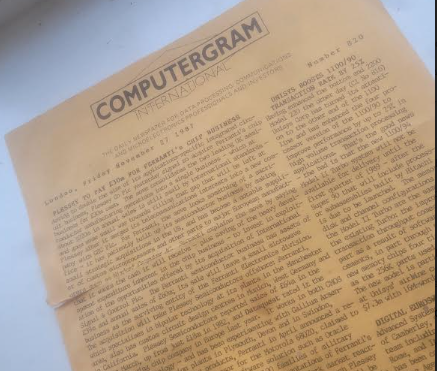
- Issue no. 820, 27 November 1987
- Editor: Tim Palmer
- Format: Newsletter
- Publisher: APT Data Services
- First issue: August 13, 1984; 42 years ago
- Final issue: April 1998 (print)
- ISSN: 0268-716X

Computergram International was a daily, pre-Internet newsletter covering enterprise information technology, published in London by APT Data Services from 1984. It eventually merged into the electronic ComputerWire service, and is now owned by Tech Monitor, one of the specialist titles within the New Statesman Media Group.

== APT Data Services ==
APT Data Services was founded in London by Peter White (publisher) and Tim Palmer (editor) in 1984. Peter White was previously the editor of Datalink Magazine from 1978. Palmer had worked as an engineer at GEC before changing course and starting his publishing career as a journalist on Computer Weekly. He then moved to the UK division of Dutch publishing company VNU and its then weekly title Infomatics. It was Palmer who persuaded VNU to launch an Infomatics spin-off title, Infomatics Daily Bulletin, in 1980. Four years later White and Palmer formed their own company to publish a rival daily, Computergram International, five days a week. Subscriptions were priced at £450 per year.

The first issue, published on 13 August 1984, included a report detailing the forthcoming launch of the IBM PC AT on the following day. Among the subscribers was Microsoft co-founder Bill Gates, who was heard to describe the publication as “that little yellow sheet”. The four (and occasionally six or eight) page newsletter was published, printed and mailed from APT's London offices on the top floor of 12 Sutton Row in Soho. It was also available on early electronic public access databases such as Micronet 800, Prestel and Telecom Gold, and then via the World Wide Web from the early 1990s.

APT Data subsequently launched a series of other IT titles, including the weekly Unigram.x newsletter (covering the rise of the Unix operating system), and the monthly Computer Business Review, Software Futures and Unix News magazines. By 1997 the company name and website had changed from APT to ComputerWire. The last paper copy of Computergram International was printed in April 1998, though the electronic service continued well into the 2000s. A core team of APT editors left the company at the end of 1999 to form the IT industry analyst firm The 451 Group.

== Sale to Datamonitor ==
Tim Palmer died in 1997. APT Data Services was finally sold off to its primary investor and advisor, Interregnum, for just £44,000 (€68,900) in June 2002, and then passed on to Datamonitor, which agreed to absorb the £1.02m in debt. The daily service was merged into Computer Business Review, which was re-branded as Tech Monitor in 2021. Tech Monitor is now part of the New Statesman Media Group (owned by Mike Danson, as Datamonitor was before its sale to Informa in 2007).

In 2003 Peter White launched an industry analyst company, Rethink Technology Research. He died in September 2023.
