= Barbara Conway =

Barbara Conway may refer to:

- Barbara Conway (journalist) (1952–1991).
- Barbara Conway, character in Babes on Broadway
- Barbara Conway, make-up artist, see 7th Irish Film & Television Awards
