= .EXE Magazine =

British computer software magazine

EXE Magazine

- March 2000 cover
- Editor: Alun Williams
- Former editors: David Mery, Will Watts, Robert Schifreen, Mark Adams
- Frequency: Monthly
- First issue: 1986
- Final issue: 2000
- Company: Centaur Media
- Country: United Kingdom
- Language: English

.EXE Magazine was a monthly computer software magazine published in the United Kingdom from 1986 to 2000.

== History and profile ==
Founded in 1986 by Mark Adams, former co-founder of PR agency Text 100, .EXE (rhymes with 'not sexy' as the magazine's official pronunciation guide states) was inspired by Dr. Dobb's Journal, the PC Tech Journal and the C Users Group Newsletter. It was conceived as a title aimed at professional programmers, in contrast to the majority of hobbyist-oriented computer magazines of the period. Adams served as the magazine's first editor.

The magazine's heyday coincided with the availability of cheap IBM PC compatibles running MS-DOS and the first widely adopted version of Windows, (Note: Windows 3.0 was released in May 1990, although many of .EXE's readers would have been beta testers before this.) both factors which encouraged the spread of programming into smaller businesses and created an audience for .EXE and similar titles that followed. Unusually for the UK, the magazine was sold primarily by postal subscription and controlled circulation, rather than in retail newsagents. This reflected its focus on a professional audience, as many readers obtained their copies through their employment.

.EXE's content consisted largely of practical how-to articles focusing on particular platforms or techniques, along with more general software development content, news, book reviews and regular columns. With an audience consisting primarily software developers, the content was largely for MS-DOS and Windows, although over the years .EXE published articles on OS/2, Modula-2, Smalltalk, and PalmPilot development, among others. The magazine featured regular columns on C++, Java, Visual Basic and Unix and took an early interest in Linux and open source more generally, particularly under the editorship of David Mery, featuring interviews with prominent open source and free software proponents including Eric Raymond and Richard Stallman.

In 1992 the magazine's publisher Process Communications was sold to Centaur Communications (now Centaur Media), ostensibly because Centaur was interested in a Process title called Software Management. In the end, Centaur elected to keep .EXE running and closed Software Management and the third Process title, BASIC Magazine. This left .EXE as the only print title aimed at software professionals at Centaur, and the only title focused on computing and technology, at least until New Media Age debuted in 1995.

In 1995 the magazine was re-branded as EXE Magazine, dropping the dot, which caused some controversy among regular readers and spawned the nickname 'Dotless' for the new version. At around the same time the magazine launched an online venture called EXplodE - later EXE Online - which started as a companion title with its own editor, but was later taken over by the print editorial team and evolved into an online archive of content and a marketing vehicle for the print title.

Several of EXE's editorial staff were well known in the UK technology community as journalists or otherwise. The magazine's second editor, Robert Schifreen, had previously been notorious for his involvement in the hacking of a Telecom Gold account belonging to Prince Philip. Other editors or staff writers included Will Watts, Danny O'Brien, Cliff Saran and Hobbit Coward.

In later years, EXE began to feature more product reviews and 'advertorial' content such as salary surveys, as its publishers sought to make the magazine more commercially focused. The magazine partnered with the UK-based Association of C and C++ Users to produce conference events. However, the market for computer magazines in general was in decline, and as knowledge and technical information about software development began to move primarily online, print titles like EXE began to lose readers and advertisers. Centaur shuttered the magazine in the summer of 2000, selling its content and branding - perhaps ironically - to the magazine that inspired its creation, Dr. Dobb's Journal.

EXE was also the first home of satirical columnist Verity Stob, who went on to write for Dr Dobbs and, latterly The Register.

== Other contemporary magazines ==
- Byte
- Dr. Dobb's Journal
- Visual Systems Journal
- PC Magazine
- Personal Computer World (PCW)
