= Barbara Conway (journalist) =

British financial journalist, author and broadcaster

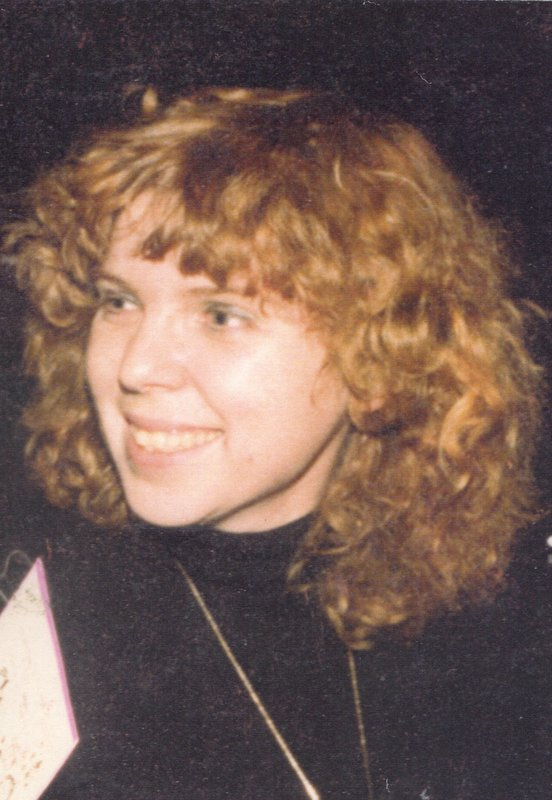
- Born: Barbara Anne Conway; 30 January 1952; London, England
- Died: 5 May 1991 (aged 39); England
- Other name: Cheapside
- Education: Barnet College
- Occupations: Financial journalist, author and broadcaster
- Relatives: David Conway (brother)

Barbara Anne Conway (30 January 1952 – 5 May 1991) was a British financial journalist, author and broadcaster.

== Early career ==
Born in London, England, and educated at Henrietta Barnett School and (briefly) at Barnet College, Conway worked briefly for The Jerusalem Post but began her British journalistic career on the weekly financial magazine Investors Guardian. From 1973 to 1977, she wrote an investigative column under the name "Cheapside" for the Investors Chronicle; "dedicated to turning up the seamier side of public companies' affairs, [the column] was as popular with readers as it was unpopular with targets. An undeniable delight in seeing illdoers squirm was combined with an equally genuine belief in the rights of shareholders". She was the sister of music historian David Conway.

== At The Daily Telegraph ==
In 1977, she joined The Daily Telegraph where she created and wrote the column "Scrutineer", also concerned with financial skulduggery. Although she moved to the Daily Mail for a brief interval, she otherwise remained at the Telegraph until 1986. During this period she published her first two books, a guide to investor rights (illustrated by the cartoonist Peter Maddocks), and an exposé of maritime fraud, on which she became an expert when breaking the news of the complex "Salem affair" of 1979–80, in which Lloyd's of London received a fraudulent claim for over $56m., the largest claim of its type in Lloyds's history at the time. Her expertise on this subject was such that Lloyds later commissioned her to write a more detailed book on the topic.

During this period, the financiers she critically investigated included Asil Nadir, Tiny Rowland, and Sir James Goldsmith, whom she so infuriated that he said he hoped she would "choke on her own vomit". Goldsmith complained to the City editor on the Telegraph that Conway was motivated by antisemitism; however, this criticism was misplaced as Conway herself was Jewish. Her professionalism was vindicated when in 1978 she gained the 'Young Financial Journalist Award' of the Wincott Foundation.

Micronet 800 page c. 1985, with Conway's comment as editor on a competition entry in Micronet's popular science fiction pages

== Later career ==
In 1986, Conway was recruited to be head of information at the newly created Securities and Investment Board. However, after a short while "her duties did not prove as fulfilling as journalistic investigation", and in 1988 she joined the newly formed business and economics unit of the BBC, in which capacity she gave numerous broadcasts. She also acted as a freelance journalist, and as an editor in the early pioneer information provider network Micronet 800 (see illustration, right).

Despite progressive illness from cancer, she continued to work up to her death; her final published article appeared a week after her death in the Financial Times, for which she wrote a series of articles on the computer industry. A colleague wrote of her: "She was an example to all reporters, a pleasure to work with, but a robust opponent in any conflict."

Conway is buried at the Western Synagogue Cemetery, Cheshunt.
