= Verity Stob =

British satirical IT columnist

- Born: United Kingdom
- Occupations: Software Developer, Author

Verity Stob is the pseudonym of a British satirical columnist. Stob is an anonymous software developer, the author of humorous and satirical articles about information technology, particularly software development. Since 1988, she has written her "Verity Stob" column for .EXE magazine, Dr. Dobb's Journal, and currently The Register. Stob was described as "the author of the longest-running satirical column on computer programming" by her fellow columnist, Andrew Orlowski.

== Career ==
Stob has been a computer and web programmer since 1984, mostly using Delphi, C++, and PHP.

In 1988, she started her pseudonymous "Verity Stob" column for .EXE magazine (now defunct). Later, she moved it to Dr. Dobb's Journal. Since 2003, her column has appeared in the British technology news and opinion website, The Register.

She lives and works in London, United Kingdom.

== Bibliography ==
- Stob, Verity (2005). The Best of Verity Stob: Highlights of Verity Stob's Famous Columns from EXE, Dr Dobb's Journal, and The Register, Apress LP. ISBN 1-59059-442-8.
