= David Conway (music historian) =

British music historian (born 1950)

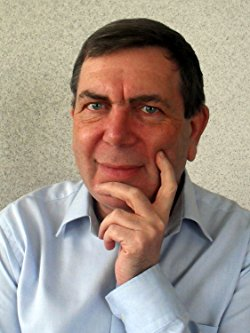
- Born: David Allen Conway; 17 February 1950 (age 76); London, England
- Education: King's College, Cambridge; University College London; Haberdashers' Aske's Boys' School
- Occupations: Music historian, academic and writer
- Relatives: Barbara Conway (sister)

David Allen Conway (born 17 February 1950) is a British music historian, academic and writer.

== Early life ==
Conway was born in London, England. His sister, Barbara Conway, was a journalist. He was educated at Haberdashers' Aske's Boys' School, and studied economics and psychology as an undergraduate at King's College, Cambridge. He obtained a PhD degree under the supervision of John Klier at University College London, where he has been an Honorary Research Fellow since 2008.

== Career ==
In the 1980s, Conway and his Czechoslovak-born wife Nadia were elected as councillors for the London Borough of Enfield, representing the Conservative Party. From 1991 to 2016, he acted as a senior expert for the European Commission in development aid projects in the countries of the former Soviet Union. His 2012 book Jewry in Music was published by Cambridge University Press. It "analyses why and how Jews, virtually absent from western art music until the end of the eighteenth century, came to be represented in all branches of the profession as leading figures – not only as composers and performers, but as publishers, impresarios and critics." The book was positively reviewed by musicologist Tina Frühauf and on the BBC Radio programme Music Matters.

Conway is a founder and director of the music festival Levočské babie leto in Levoča, Slovakia. Since 2018 he has been chair of the opera company HGO (formerly Hampstead Garden Opera).

In the academic year 2019–20, Conway was a Polonsky Visiting Fellow at Oxford University. He contributes to journals including Slavonic and East European Review, The Wagner Journal and Jewish Renaissance.

== Publications ==
Conway's publications include:

- Jewry in Music: Entry to the Profession from the Enlightenment to Richard Wagner (2012). Cambridge: Cambridge University Press. ISBN 978-1-316-63960-3.
- "A New Song" in The Cambridge Companion to Jewish Music, ed. Joshua Walden (2015). Cambridge: Cambridge University Press. ISBN 978-1-107-62375-0.
- "The Real Faust: Heine's Faust Ballet Scenario 1846–1948", in The Oxford Handbook of Faust in Music, ed. Lorna Fitzsimmons and Charles McKnight (2019). Oxford: Oxford University Press. ISBN 978-0-19-993518-5.
- "Spontini's Complaint", in Judaism in Opera, ed. I. Schmid-Reider and A. Cahn, Regensburg: Conbrio Verlag (2017). ISBN 978-3-940768-68-1.
