= Police and Justice Act 2006 =

Act of the Parliament of the United Kingdom

Police and Justice Act 2006 (Note: Section 55.)
- Act of Parliament
- Parliament of the United Kingdom
- Long title: An Act to establish a National Policing Improvement Agency; to make provision about police forces and police authorities and about police pensions; to make provision about police powers and about the powers and duties of community support officers, weights and measures inspectors and others; to make provision about the supply to the police and others of information contained in registers of death; to make further provision for combatting crime and disorder; to make further provision about certain inspectorates; to amend Part 12 of the Criminal Justice Act 2003; to amend the Computer Misuse Act 1990; to make provision about the forfeiture of indecent images of children; to provide for the conferring of functions on the Independent Police Complaints Commission in relation to the exercise of enforcement functions by officials involved with immigration and asylum; to amend the Extradition Act 2003; to make further provision about the use of live links in criminal proceedings; and for connected purposes.
- Citation: 2006 c. 48
- Territorial extent: England and Wales; Scotland (in part); Northern Ireland (in part); (Note: Section 54.)

Dates
- Royal assent: 8 November 2006
- Commencement: Various (Note: Section 53.)
Other legislation
Amends	Criminal Damage Act 1971; Police Pensions Act 1976; Bail Act 1976; Protection of Children Act 1978; Aviation Security Act 1982; Criminal Justice Act 1988; Computer Misuse Act 1990; Criminal Procedure (Consequential Provisions) (Scotland) Act 1995; Police Act 1996; Youth Justice and Criminal Evidence Act 1999; Scottish Public Services Ombudsman Act 2002; Criminal Justice Act 2003; Extradition Act 2003; Justice (Northern Ireland) Act 2004; Public Audit (Wales) Act 2004; Constitutional Reform Act 2005; Immigration, Asylum and Nationality Act 2006
Amended by	Mental Health Act 2007; Criminal Justice and Immigration Act 2008; Constitutional Reform and Governance Act 2010; Policing and Crime Act 2017; Sentencing Act 2020; Legislation (Procedure, Publication and Repeals) (Wales) Act 2025

Status: Amended

Text of statute as originally enacted

Revised text of statute as amended

The Police and Justice Act 2006 (c. 48) (PJA) is an act of the Parliament of the United Kingdom. It received royal assent on 8 November 2006. The PJA created the National Policing Improvement Agency. It changed how members of police authorities may be appointed and altered their duties. It increased police officers' powers to impose bail conditions when releasing a suspect. Along with the Serious Crime Act 2007, the PJA also updated the Computer Misuse Act 1990, which was regarded as outdated when the two statutes were passed. Pursuant to the PJA, the scope of the Computer Misuse Act was extended to deal with denial-of-service attacks.

== See also ==
- Police Act

== Sources ==
- Fafinski, Stefan (February 2008). "Computer Misuse: The Implications of the Police and Justice Act 2006". The Journal of Criminal Law. 72 (1): 53–66. doi:10.1350/jcla.2008.72.1.477. ISSN 0022-0183. S2CID 145414940.
