= Stephen Gold =

British hacker and journalist (1956–2015)

Stephen Gold (15 January 1956 – 12 January 2015) was a hacker and journalist who in the mid-1980s was charged with, convicted and later acquitted of, 'uttering a forgery' in what became known to the popular press of the time as "The Great Prestel Hack". Gold, and fellow hacker Robert Schifreen, were said to have accessed, inter alia, the personal message account of Prince Philip. The facts as outlined in The Hacker's Handbook are that he was 'fitted' up, having tried, repeatedly and unsuccessfully, to warn BT's Prestel via Micronet of the security holes. Gold later became a "respected information security journalist".

In 1984, Gold and fellow journalist/hacker Robert Schifreen demonstrated an "ad hoc penetration test" of a Prestel network which, according to the writer Nick Barron, used "a combination of clever shoulder surfing and good old-fashioned hacking skills". An archive telling the story of how the 1980s hack of Prince Philip’s mailbox led to UK anti-hacking legislation is held at The National Museum of Computing in Bletchley.

Gold and Schifreen were convicted in 1986, (after a series of pre-'trials') at Southwark Crown Court on a charge of misusing passwords: the actual charge sheet read "uttering a forgery", under the Forgery and Counterfeiting Act 1981. They appealed successfully and were twice acquitted by higher courts on the basis that they had not obtained any material gain from their exploits. The appeals were pursued right up to the House of Lords by BT at taxpayers expense during the Thatcher era. Their case, it has been said, "led directly to the introduction of the 1990 Computer Misuse Act".

Gold was 'de facto' author of the fourth edition of The Hacker's Handbook, previous editions of which had been completed by "Hugo Cornwall", [now] Professor Peter Sommer.

Gold died on 12 January 2015. He is commemorated by webpage Silent Modems, which was created by friends and followers in his memory.

== See also ==
- Timeline of hacker history
