= Salem (supertanker) =

History
- Name: Sea Sovereign (1969–1977); South Sun (1977–1979); Salem (1979–1980)
- Owner: Salénrederierna AB (1969–1977); Pimmerton Shipping Ltd. (1977–1979); Oxford Shipping Incorporated, Houston
- Port of registry: Monrovia
- Builder: Kockums Mekaniska Verkstad, Malmö
- Launched: 1 August 1969
- Christened: 1969
- Identification: IMO number: 7000798
- Fate: Sank 17 January 1980

General characteristics
- Class & type: VLCC
- Tonnage: 96,228 GRT
- Length: 316.08 m (1,037 ft 0 in) (LOA)
- Beam: 48.77 m (160 ft 0 in)
- Height: 24.50 m (80 ft 5 in)
- Installed power: 24,000 kW (32,000 hp)
- Propulsion: 1 × Stal-Laval steam turbine
- Speed: 16 knots (30 km/h; 18 mph) max
- Crew: 25

Salem was a supertanker which was scuttled off the coast of Guinea on 17 January 1980, after secretly unloading 192,000 tons of oil at Durban, South Africa. The oil was delivered in breach of the South African oil embargo, and the ship was scuttled to fraudulently claim insurance.

== History ==
=== Ship ===
The tanker, TT Sea Sovereign', entered service in 1969 at Stockholm for Salénrederierna AB and built at the Kockums shipyard in Malmö. In 1977 Salénrederierna sold the tanker to Pimmerton Shipping Ltd. (Liberia), as South Sun and ship management was placed in the hands of Wallem Ship Management Ltd. (Hong Kong). Two years later South Sun was sold to Oxford Shipping Inc. (U.S.). The ship was renamed Salem, but remained under the Liberian flag.

=== Loading and sinking ===
On 30 November 1979 Salem left the port of Piraeus to load oil in the Kuwaiti port of Mina Al Ahmadi, on behalf of an Italian charterer. She loaded approximately 194,000 tons of light crude oil to be discharged in Genoa. The tanker, with her cargo, was insured at Lloyd's of London. She left Mina Al Ahmadi on 10 December and proceeded down the East African coast. On 27 December under the name Lema she entered the port of Durban, South Africa. There, the ship discharged 170–180,000 tons of cargo, and took on the same amount in ballast water in order to stay on a laden draft. She departed Durban on 2 January 1980. On 17 January 1980, under the name Salem, she was found off the Senegalese coast in distress. The British tanker British Trident rescued the crew of the sinking tanker.

=== Fraud ===
Four days after leaving the port of Mina Al Ahmadi, the charterers in Genoa sold the cargo to the Shell Group for [US$]56 million. This type of transaction is not uncommon. When the British tanker British Trident rescued the shipwrecked Salem crew, it was observed that not only had the crew taken all their belongings in suitcases but they had gone so far as to rescue a number of other items including duty-free goods and sandwiches, although the tanker was supposed to have sunk so quickly, after several explosions, that there was not enough time to save the ship's log. Far more striking was that, despite the ostensible cargo of nearly 200,000 tons of crude oil and having suffered sufficient explosion damage to cause her to sink, there was barely a trace of the vessel left on the surface.

=== Aftermath ===
After Salem's loss, Lloyd's of London received an insurance claim of US$56.3 million from the owner of the cargo. It was the largest single claim that Lloyd's had received up to that time. Research by Lloyd's revealed that the South African oil company Sasol, had bought the Lema / Salem cargo in Durban for US$43 million.

A Greek court sentenced a shipping agent and four members of the crew for complicity in the insurance fraud.
