= Dialcom =

Dialcom Inc. was a United States corporation which developed the world's first commercial electronic mail service. It was founded in 1970 by Robert F. Ryan and was sold to ITT Corporation in 1982, becoming ITT Dialcom. Dialcom's e-mail software ran on Prime minicomputers and was licensed to governmental telecommunications providers in over seventeen countries. Various extra features could be offered by Dialcom-based services, including gateways to telex and fax, and online information retrieval services. In 1986, British Telecom, who used Dialcom software for its Telecom Gold service, bought Dialcom from ITT.

== Dialcom systems ==
Each Dialcom system was allocated a two-digit identification number. This was used as a prefix for the Dialcom e-mail addresses (or "mailboxes"), thus allowing e-mail to be exchanged between different Dialcom services. By 1990, the following Dialcom systems were operating:

Country	Service	Systems
Australia	Minerva/Keylink	07, 08, 09
Canada	Infotex	20–24
Denmark	Databoks	71
Finland	Telebox	62
Germany	Telebox	15, 16
Hong Kong	Dialcom	88, 89
Ireland	Eirmail	74
Israel	Goldnet	05, 06
Italy	Mastermail	65–68
Japan	KDMINC	13, 14
South Korea	Dialcom	52
Malta	Telecom Gold	75
Mexico	Telepro	52
Netherlands	Memocom	27–29, 55
New Zealand	Starnet	01, 02
Puerto Rico	Dialcom	25
Singapore	Telebox	10–12
Taiwan	Dialcom	52
United Kingdom	Telecom Gold	01, 04, 17, 80–89
United States	Dialcom	29–34, 37, 38, 41–59, 61–63, 90–99

== Time-sharing service ==
Dialcom began as computer time-sharing services. A user would sign on using a Teletype Model 33 ASR and a modem with acoustic coupler, running at 110 bps. A command-line interface was available with programming languages such as BASIC and Fortran. The Company grew and evolved quickly over a four-year period through a series of acquisitions led by Robert F. Ryan, Founder, President and CEO. By 1974 Dialcom was nationwide and offering a number of "off the shelf" products such as accounting and payroll services. Dialcom "reinvented" itself about every four years by coming out with a completely new product line (all related though the thread of telecommunications) to become the dominant leader in whichever area it targeted, while still supporting and growing the prior underlying services. In 1974 Dialcom developed an online word processing and document management suite of products. For one of its major clients, the US House of Representatives, Dialcom supplied a total constituent management system (CRS) to 240 of the 435 House offices. This service was also marketed to associations and large corporations. Four years later Dialcom developed and successfully marketed the first commercial email service in the US and then went international with that service. Mr. Ryan was the sole marketer and negotiator for all international sales that were done at the ministerial level in each country. In keeping with the corporate philosophy of constant innovation and evolution, during 1980 Dialcom was the creator, designer, developer, computing and network engine of "The Source".

Robert Ryan developed and executed a structured plan that led to over a decade of steady geographic and product growth with sustained and growing profitability. He identified, secured financing, negotiated and successfully acquired and merged six struggling companies resulting in the rapid growth and profitability of the parent company - steadily transforming a small computer service bureau into the world leader of electronic mail services with offices in nineteen countries. Dialcom was the first email service offered in the US or any other country and it controlled 35% and 98% US and international email market share respectively. International expansion was accomplished through strategic partnerships and joint ventures with the governmental telecommunications bodies in all major telecommunications consuming countries. Robert Ryan developed and negotiated all international licenses and partnerships. Market growth and profitability was constant through these intense periods of geographic and product expansion. In 1982 Robert Ryan negotiated the sale of Dialcom to ITT and remained as CEO for three years.

Concurrent with Dialcom and with the support of the Dialcom Board of Directors Robert Ryan was co-founder and president of Source Telecomputing Corporation. In concert with William VonMeister (deceased) Robert Ryan conceived, financed, designed, and implemented "The Source" – America's first consumer-oriented information service – the direct predecessor of AOL. After achieving dominant market share in its first year of operation, "The Source" was sold by management to Reader's Digest. Mr Ryan has to date started or managed (at C level positions) over a dozen companies during his ongoing career. He is a long-standing supporter of entrepreneurship and has worked with educational institutions to further his beliefs.

Eric Schmidt, who would later become CEO of Novell and Google, worked for Dialcom during high school.
