= Prestel =

British videotex service

- Prestel logo designed by Mervyn Kurlansky of Pentagram
- Developer: Post Office Telecommunications
- Key people: Samuel Fedida
- Type: General-purpose public videotex service
- Launched: 1979; 47 years ago
- Discontinued: 1994; 32 years ago
- Platform: GEC 4000 minicomputers in a star network configuration with packet-switched connections
- Operating system: OS4000 operating system supporting BABBAGE high-level assembly language
- Status: Discontinued
- Members: c. 95,500 terminals attached at peak
- Pricing model: Subscription (quarterly) and usage (time spent on system, some pages, some messaging service actions)

Prestel was the brand name of a videotex service launched in the UK in 1979 by Post Office Telecommunications, a division of the British Post Office. (Note: According to Alex Reid, the first Director of Prestel: "The question of what our commercial viewdata system should be called was given careful thought ... To build a commercial brand we had to choose a new name. I undertook this process personally, compiling a long list of simple words [and] then subjected a short list to professional checking for availability and protection worldwide ... [t]he winner in this exercise was Prestel. Pre had connotations of press, presentation, press button, prestige and premium. Tel had the telecomms connotation.") It had around 95,500 attached terminals at its peak, and was a forerunner of the internet-based online services developed in the late 20th and early 21st centuries. Prestel was discontinued in 1994 and its assets sold by British Telecom to a company consortium.

A subscriber to Prestel used an adapted TV set with a keypad or keyboard, a dedicated terminal, or a microcomputer to interact with a central database via an ordinary phoneline. Prestel offered hundreds of thousands of pages of general and specialised information, ranging from consumer advice to financial data, as well as services such as home banking, online shopping, travel booking, telesoftware, and messaging.

In September 1982, to mark Information Technology Year, (Note: IT82 was a £3.75m UK government initiative to raise awareness about information technology and promote its take-up.) the Royal Mail issued two commemorative stamps, one of which featured a Prestel TV set and keyboard. In April 1984, British Telecom won a Queen's Award for Technological Achievement for the development of Prestel.

== History ==
=== Invention and development ===
In 1970, Samuel Fedida, a research engineer who had worked at English Electric and a US consultancy company, joined the Post Office as head of the Computer Applications Research Division. Within a year, he had completed the initial design of a viewdata system (the generic term in use at the time) for the general public: it would comprise information stored on a central computer accessed over the public phone network using modified televisions as terminals. By early 1973, the Post Office had decided to develop an experimental system, and was working with the BBC, the Independent Broadcasting Authority, and standards organisations to develop compatible standards for teletext and viewdata. During 1974, it decided to commercialise the viewdata concept.

=== Pilot trial ===
The first public demonstration of viewdata took place in London in 1975 during Eurocomp, the European Computing Conference on Communications Networks, where Fedida presented a paper on the technology and the potential appeal, as the Post Office saw it, of a public interactive information service.

Further demonstrations followed, and based on the favourable reactions of TV manufacturers and potential providers of information and services, the Post Office decided to run a pilot trial. It also agreed with potential information providers (IPs) that it would not select IPs or exert editorial control over what they put on the system.

The two-year pilot service began in January 1976. By mid-1977, IPs included the Consumers' Association, the British Farm Produce Council, British Rail, London Transport, the Open University, the London Stock Exchange, the Institute for Scientific Information, and National Giro. Interviewed by The Times, Fedida was quoted as saying that the Post Office saw viewdata playing several roles: as a "centralised information source", an "intelligent interface" to specialised scientific and technical data, a "communication machine" for passing messages, a personal information store, a new information distribution medium, a "channel for education in the home", and as providing an "advanced calculator service".

=== Test service ===
After some delay, the Post Office launched a test service of Prestel, as it was now called, in October 1978. At the end of December, there were 95,500 information pages, growing at a rate of 3,500 per week, and just over 300 users, increasing by 30–50 per week.

=== Commercial launch ===
In March 1979, the Post Office opened a limited "London Residential Service" for subscribers in the capital. The full commercial service launched in September 1979; the director of Prestel stated that there were over 130,000 pages in the database and 1363 "sets" connected to the system at the start of that month.

By February 1980, there were 131 IPs and 116 sub-IPs. The Post Office categorised the IPs as follows: national and local newspaper groups; magazine and other publishing groups; central government departments, and other agencies (such as the British Tourist Authority and the British Library); nationalised industries (including British Airways, Sealink, and British Rail), and companies in other fields of business, such as banks and travel agencies; new companies set up to exploit the viewdata medium, and those expanding from an existing base of online services, such as Reuters; associations; software companies; and miscellaneous.

Particularly popular were the travel-oriented nationalised industries; new companies, such as Fintel; and the Consumers' Association. Overall, popular topics included games, quizzes, jokes, and horoscopes; the Stock Market, company information, and business news; travel and holiday information; national news, sports, and "What's On" locally; cars; and consumer advice. This was reflected in advertisements for Prestel.

Writing in the winter 1980/81 issue of British Telecom Journal, Prestel's public relations manager stated there were over 7,500 sets attached to the system, 170,000 frames in use, and more than 400 IPs and sub-IPs. By the end of 1981, according to Butler Cox, a management consultancy, Prestel had 2,000 residential and 11,000 business users, with 14,000 "terminals" [sic] in use. The service was within local call reach of 62% of phone subscribers in Britain. IPs numbered 153, with 593 sub-IPs. Users accessed 190,000 frames per day, and the average time on the system, for each user per day, was 9 minutes. There were 193,000 frames available, including 2,000 response frames. § Response frames

==== Prestel Gateway ====
March 1982 saw the launch of the Prestel Gateway service. This enabled users to connect, via the Prestel network, to external computers operated by IPs or other companies. Travel agents, for example, used Gateway to connect to tour operators' systems and make reservations.

==== User charges ====
At the launch of the commercial service in September 1979, and in addition to phone charges, users were charged 3p per minute online to Prestel from 8 am to 6 pm Monday to Friday, and 3p for three minutes at other times. Installing a phone jack-socket cost £13, with a quarterly rental of 50p. Business users paid an additional standing charge (i.e., a flat charge regardless of usage) of £12 per quarter.

By October 1982, the online usage charge had risen to 5p per minute (8 am to 6 pm Monday to Friday and also 8 am to 1 pm on Saturdays, free at other times), the business standing charge to £15 per quarter, residential users now paid £5 per quarter, and jack installation cost "from £15", with a 15p quarterly rental fee.

=== Growth ===
From September 1986, under page *656#, Prestel's publicity department published a "Factframe" showing, at the end of each month, the average number of terminals attached and the respective percentages in businesses and in homes; the number of frames available and the number of frame accesses per week; and the number of messages sent per week. Actual subscriber figures were not published; Thomas et al. (1992) suggest these were "significantly less" than the number of terminals, as "businesses were assumed to 'attach' more than one terminal", and note that British Telecom stopped publishing figures at the end of 1988.

In September 1982, The Times reported there were 18,000 users, of whom 3,000 were residential. Noting that British Telecom had originally forecast 50,000 users at this point, the report went on to outline a new approach to attracting them, quoting senior managers from British Telecom and the head of a joint venture. The plans involved the introduction of a home banking service; the marketing of a Prestel adaptor for computer terminals to the business and higher education sectors; and the launch of Micronet 800, a service for microcomputer users.

Six months later, in February 1983, the same newspaper recorded 22,400 users, of whom 15% were residential, writing that the future of Prestel "could be in doubt by 1985 if it is not approaching profitability."

In mid-1984, the UK Department of Trade and Industry issued a booklet stating that the availability of travel information, the launch of Micronet 800, and the provision nationwide of the messaging service, Mailbox, had contributed to a rise to 45,000 attached terminals by June of that year. 61% were in businesses, and 39% in homes. In that month, on average, the Prestel database contained 320,000 frames that were accessed 14.6 million times. 17 Prestel Gateways to external computers were in operation. For July, the Butler Cox consultancy recorded 47,000 users (60% business, 40% residential), and a total of 1,200 IPs and sub-IPs.

In December 1984, Prestel's general manager stated that there were 50,000 subscribers. Reviewing the lessons learnt since the start of the service in 1979, he noted that "An 'all things to all people' approach didn't work and had to be replaced by a system of interactive services targeted at specific markets", and that in his view, "The parameters that have stood the test of time are user-friendliness, low cost, use of existing telephone networks, and the inexpensive alphamosaic (Note: The set of mosaic characters used for composing rudimentary graphics on Prestel pages.) format."

In mid-1985, The Times stated there were 53,000 "terminals, adapted televisions, microcomputers or specially designed units" attached to Prestel, with residential users now accounting for 45% of the total. In the reporter's view, this represented "a change of fortune for [a service] deemed commercially dubious by many commentators." The figure of 65,000 was reached at the beginning of 1986 – about a third were Micronet 800 subscribers. Prestel had reportedly traded at a profit from the previous October onwards. Commenting in September 1986 on what it referred to as "only 70,000 users ... growing at a rate of ... a few hundred customers a week", The Times declared that Prestel "had failed to live up to expectations", comparing it unfavourably to the French Teletel videotex service and to British Telecom's own Telecom Gold electronic mail service. Earlier in the year, The Guardian had also praised Teletel, asking "Can Prestel be improved or should we just scrap it and start again?", and questioning whether a scrolling, text-based system, such as CompuServe's, was in any case preferred by most consumers over page- and graphics-orientated videotex services.

Writing in The Guardian just before Christmas 1988, Jack Schofield reported that Prestel "had become reclusive" about user numbers, with the Factframe, "[a]fter prompting, ... finally updated this summer ... claim[ing] 90,000 users", while the figure of "only 75,000" was being quoted by the British Telecom manager responsible for the service. In January 1989, drawing on what turned out to be the final Factframe, published at the end of 1988, Schofield wrote that "After ten years, [Prestel] has yet to achieve the number of users it expected to get in its first year", quoting a figure of 95,460 terminals attached. This was the highest figure claimed during the lifetime of Prestel.

=== Decline ===
In October 1991, British Telecom closed Micronet 800, stating, in a letter to customers, that "With over 10,000 members, Micronet is easily the largest online service in the UK specialising in microcomputing. However, it is still not large enough to enable us to maintain a cost-effective service and provide the extra facilities requested by our customers." Membership had decreased from a peak of around 20,000. The Guardian attributed this to the introduction by British Telecom of an off-peak Prestel time-charge in mid-1988, discouraging the use of Micronet's popular "Chatline" service. The Times agreed, and also pointed to a steep rise in subscription charges, opining that "BT's failure to provide even this committed group with an economic ... service means that Prestel is destined ... for businesses." The closure in April 1991 of Homelink, the home banking service launched in 1983 by the Nottingham Building Society, also contributed to shrinking the number of Prestel subscribers.

During 1991, Prestel was closed to residential users. Towards the end of 1993, it was reported that British Telecom was planning to close Prestel altogether: according to the company, of the around 35,000 subscribers at that point, only some 2,500 used the service regularly.

=== Closure ===
British Telecom closed Prestel in early 1994, selling it to a consortium. It was rebranded as "New Prestel", focusing on the provision of financial data to businesses. In mid-1996, New Prestel transferred to the Web, becoming the Internet service provider (ISP) "Prestel On-line"

In 1999, the financial data component of Prestel On-line was bought by the company Financial Express to become "Financial Express Prestel". The service component merged with the ISP Demon Internet, which ran a "Prestel Internet Service". This closed in 2002.

=== Analyses ===
Writing in early 1979 about the test service that had launched in October 1978, a Post Office executive concluded that:

"The strengths of viewdata include its visual attractiveness, its ease of use, low cost and its wide range of applications. Its weaknesses include its small information window, unsophisticated search methods, its limited storage capacity and its lack of computer power for users. How rapidly viewdata will become established, and the exact role it will fulfil, is as yet a matter of speculation."

In the aftermath of Prestel's pivot away, in the early 1980s, from a focus on the general public to targeting the business community, the professions, and microcomputing enthusiasts, Noll (1985) studied the possible reasons for Prestel's lack of take-up by households. He concluded that the following factors might have been significant: a shortage, at the beginning of the commercial service, of affordable Prestel-adapted TV sets and, later, adaptors; relatively high frame-access and time-based online charges; the large size of the database, and the difficulty of searching it; and the variation in how information providers (IPs) arranged and presented their Prestel pages.

Noll contrasted the "relative failure" of Prestel with the "success" of teletext, noting that receiving the latter was free and its database much smaller. Overall, he questioned "the [...] hypothesis that the information needs of consumers can be satisfied by a large, centralized, computerized database of general-interest information."

After consulting a group of experts in the videotex domain, the information scientists Grover & Sabherwal drew conclusions (1989) that largely concurred with Noll's. In addition, they judged that government subsidies were required to boost public interest and mass take-up. This latter view was also held by Mosco, a political economist, who wrote in 1982: "[T]he British government appears to be prepared to let Prestel sink or swim on its own commercial ability [sic] ... It is too early to offer a complete assessment of Prestel. However, the direction of development is clear: the need for immediate commercial success means cutting back on earlier mass marketing efforts and an emphasis on specific business uses."

In a paper published shortly after Prestel had been discontinued in 1994, Case, an information scientist, examined the motivations behind the development of this and other videotex services from a sociological perspective. In his view, "[E]xplanations of videotex require consideration of higher-level phenomena [such] as policy, ideology, belief, and vision". He identified the envisioning of videotex as a facilitator of mass participation in an emerging information society – a belief held and promoted by many politicians, futurists, sociologists, and business leaders in the 1960s and 1970s – as a crucial spur to the development of the technology, sustained investment, and the roll-out of services. This vision was animated, according to communications technology researchers Harmeet & Sandvig's summary (2006) of scholarly views, by the "converging agendas of myriad players ... all seeking to increase revenues in otherwise saturated markets": phone companies (increased network traffic), set and terminal manufacturers (more sales), newspapers and news agencies (additional outlets for content), and business sectors such as banks and the travel trade (looking to reduce transaction costs).

Regarding Prestel, Case summarised the problems it faced (as described by a former chief executive) as the lack of a trigger service, (Note: A key service or feature that would have attracted subscribers and kept them engaged.) low-quality information, complicated charges, competing services, and uncoordinated marketing by IPs, British Telecom, and terminal and adaptor providers. Insufficient market research into "what sorts of information people actually use, and what delivery modes are appropriate for them" was identified by public policy researchers Thomas & Miles (1989) as a further reason why Prestel failed to live up to expectations.

Poor, a communications researcher, suggested (2006) that the failure of Prestel to achieve significant mass-market take-up was linked to its "highly centralized and closed" nature. He cited the control over content exercised by IPs and the system operator, British Telecom, coupled with a lack of connectivity to both non-videotex online services and other videotex services based on different technical standards. On standards, Poor (2004) believed that "A universal videotex standard would have been like the common gauge for railroad, or common standards for the telegraph or the telephone. Disparate systems could connect, and enjoy network externalities due to scale."

== Database ==
=== Pages and frames ===
==== Numbering ====
Information on Prestel was held in a database of "pages". Each page corresponded to a screenful of information, and had a unique number up to nine digits long. (Note: I.e, page numbers could run from 0 to 999999999.)

A page could have up to 26 sub-pages, with each sub-page labelled with a letter from "a" to "z". A sub-page was called a "frame": the page itself was frame "a". Neither pages nor frames could scroll.

Each IP rented a three-digit number as its master page. For example, the Meteorological Office's was 209, and the numbers identifying all its pages began with these digits – such as for 20971, the page for "Aviation forecasts".

Single- and double-digit pages were reserved by Prestel for system information purposes, such as page 1, which showed the main index. Pages starting with 9 were for account and other system management functions: page 92, for example, showed details of a Prestel user's bill.

==== Types ====
Most frames were set up to provide information. Other types were for messaging, or provided a gateway to services on other computers. A "follow-on" type caused the next frame in sequence to be automatically displayed as soon as the current frame had filled the screen.

By embedding cursor-control characters in the page, simple animations could be produced by rewriting parts of the screen already displayed. These were known as "dynamic frames". (Note: Dynamic frames could not be created online: their preparation required specialist software and then uploading via the "bulk update" facility. No timing options were available beyond those imposed by the transmission speed, which was usually 1200 baud.) Combined with the follow-on attribute, this provided a way to continue animations that could not fit within the number of characters available in one frame alone.

This follow-on frame attribute was also used for telesoftware, enabling computer programs, such as those for the BBC Micro, to be downloaded from Prestel. (Note: The first few frames acted as headers. For example, a program would be described on frames 70067a and b, while frame c gave the number of subsequent frames containing the program, and a checksum.The telesoftware program itself started in frame d. To verify a successful download, software compared the checksum with a value calculated from the result of downloading all the frames required. If the check failed, the program had to be downloaded again.)

==== Layout, design, and writing for Prestel ====
Each frame had 24 lines of 40 characters each, and as in the format used by the Ceefax and ORACLE teletext services, could contain a maximum of 960 characters. The bottom line was reserved for system messages, leaving 920 characters for the Information Provider (IP). The top line, showing the name or logo of the IP, the page number, and the price, occupied at least 43 characters, depending on the design of the logo. This left 22 lines and a maximum 877 characters available for the IP to present information to the user.

When preparing and editing a page, an IP could use upper- and lower-case letters, digits, punctuation marks, a few arithmetic symbols, and a set of "mosaic characters" for composing rudimentary graphics. (Note: The character set conformed with a variant of the ISO/IEC 646 and CCITT standards; it was formalised in the 1981 CEPT videotex standard as the CEPT3 profile.) The appearance of a character could be changed using a display-attribute code. These modified the appearance of subsequent characters on the same row of the screen, and themselves occupied one character position, which was displayed as a space.

In early 1978, at the end of the pilot trial, Post Office Telecommunications commissioned a study of the content and function of Prestel and how these aspects related to the graphic design of Prestel pages. Several graphics designers were consulted (including the designer of Prestel's logo and its index and system pages), along with professional writers, journalists, media specialists, and database managers.

On graphic design, the main conclusions reached were to encourage IPs to use only a few colours on each page; to take into account the variety of TV sets and other terminals in use (colour or monochrome, different screen sizes, a range of serif or sans-serif typefaces); and to accommodate users with poor sight or colour blindness. Building on the study's results and the outcomes of other research, Reynolds (1979) made recommendations for presenting text, tables, indexes and graphics in Prestel-type videotex systems and in teletext.

On writing for Prestel, the main finding of the study was to never undertake the composition and editing of content without considering the physical and technical limitations of the Prestel page and the overall structure of the information of which it formed a part. On style, the study's report highlighted the views of the writer and academic Raymond Williams: (Note: Concluding remarks at the study's Writing for Prestel seminar, London, 15 November 1978.) "The English sentence is a very flexible animal, and we all know what happened to it with the invention of printing. We shouldn't feel confined by it in Prestel."

Surveying how Prestel's content had developed a year or so after its commercial launch, Rex Winsbury, a media journalist and editorial director of Fintel, (Note: Fintel was a joint venture between the Financial Times and Extel.) a major IP, wrote:

[E]diting demands that something useful be said on each page without fuss or flannel in a very short space. Viewdata does not like long sentences or qualifications. Nor must you cram too many words on to the screen; otherwise it looks a mess. Each page has to have a single message, and a clear one at that. Two short paragraphs ... or a few columns of figures to a page, are the most you will find ... It comes down to what newspapermen [sic] call "tight subbing".

=== Links ===
A page could be directly linked to up to ten other pages by specifying, during editing, the number of the page whose content would be displayed when a user pressed a digit from 0 to 9 on their keypad or keyboard. Double-digit links – such as "56" – were achieved by linking the first digit to an intermediate, stepping-stone frame on the IP's database: this, in turn, connected the second digit to the target page.

The content of pages ranged between two poles: at one, a menu listing the topics available and the number to key to reach them, with no, or minimal, further information – referred to as an "index page"; and at the other, a screenful of information with few, if any, links to other pages – an "information page". According to Rex Winsbury, as experience with the viewdata medium grew, IPs "gave information on all or most pages, simply varying the amount according to the number of routings [links] that have to be given as well."

=== Structures ===
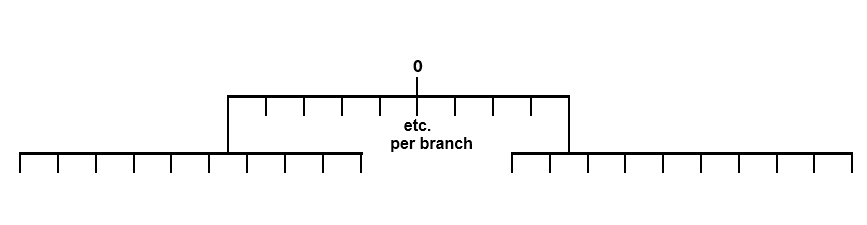
Original Prestel "inverted tree" database structure: each page could be linked to up to ten other pages

When the public Prestel service began in 1979, a user connecting to the system was presented with the main index page. As they made and keyed successive menu choices, they moved down a subject hierarchy, from the general to the specific, to finish with the information page they sought. The Post Office, academics, and the media referred to this hierarchical database arrangement as a tree structure or "inverted tree".

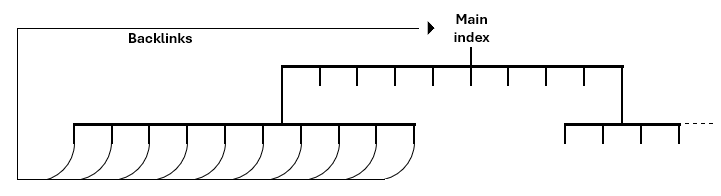
Links back to the main index were the first refinement made

Though simple in theory, in practice this structure could lead a user to a dead end: they might find that how a subject was described in a menu did not match what they saw on the final destination page, or formed only part of what they were looking for, or provided information without the means to look up related material. Going back through the sequence of menu choices (using the *# command) to try another series of links was limited to three steps in all.

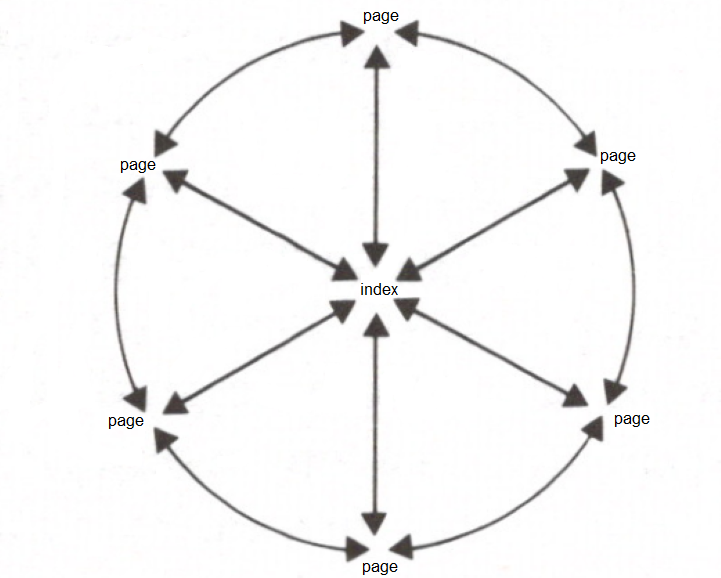
With the "cartwheel", a user could browse pages in sequence, such as monthly statistics, or access each page directly

As Prestel developed, IPs accommodated the particularities of the different types of information and services they provided, and the expectations of their users, through the extensive use of backlinks and crosslinks between their pages. This resulted in a variety of database structures that acquired labels such as cartwheels, ring-of-rings, Chinese lanterns and lobster-pots to help visualise how pages were connected. IPs were exhorted to keep things simple from the user's point of view:

The more varied the requirements of users, the more complex the routeing structures become – not that the user will perceive them as complex. Indeed, he should see such a structure as very simple to use, as helpful routeing choices are offered to him at each stage, whatever his needs or interests.

=== Navigation and search ===
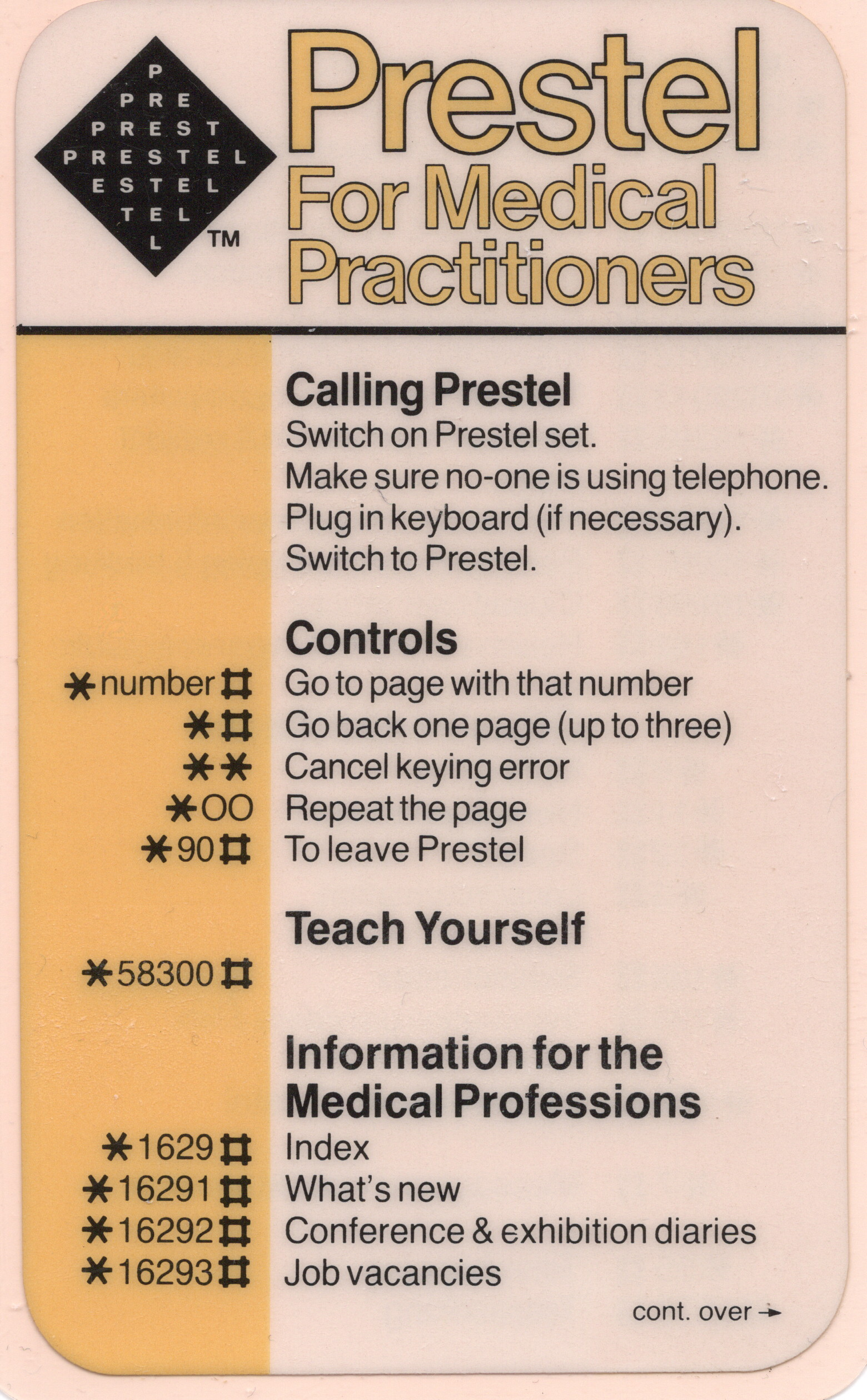
front

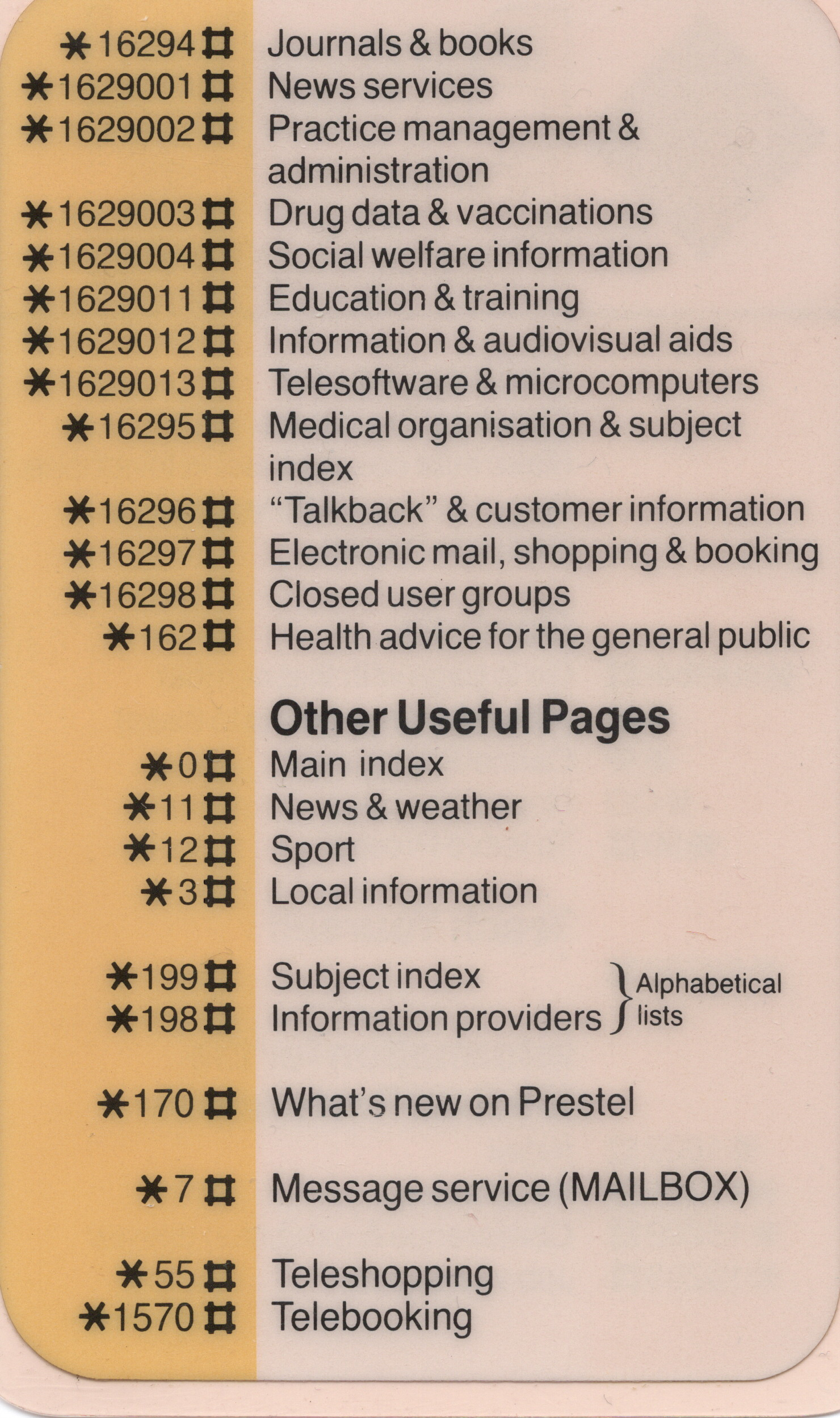
back

Pocket guide to Prestel for medical practitioners, c. 1984. Their welcome page was 1629. Laminated card, 6.9 x 11 cm

There were three basic navigation commands:

- *number# took the user directly to the first frame of the page number specified: for example, *5052# displayed the contents of 5052a onscreen;
- # moved the user successively forward through the frames: 5052b, 5052c, and so on;
- *# returned the user to the previous page in strict sequence, and could be repeated three times.

Keyword access was introduced in 1987, with *keyword# taking the user directly to the subject (or subject index) specified.

A topic index, updated daily, was published on page 199, and an IP index on page 198. A printed A‍–‍Z Start-Up Directory of the topics available on Prestel, with the appropriate page number to key, was sent to new users. From 1987, the topic names could also be used as keywords. Micronet 800, an IP, visualised the relationships between its pages in a London Tube-style schematic map as part of a guide for users.

From 1983 to mid-1987, The Prestel Directory, a quarterly magazine, was distributed free to all Prestel users and also available on subscription: it contained a user guide and subject index, a list of IPs and sub-IPs, feature articles, and videotex product news. (Note: ISSN 0266-0288. OCLC 1230877457.) This was superseded by Connexions, sent to users every two months till May 1988. A directory was also incorporated into the quarterly Prestel Business Directory published by the Financial Times from 1979.

From January 1986, Prestel published Focus magazine on page 123 "to show you the most useful, entertaining and topical pages from the thousands available." It spotlighted news, sport, weather, and entertainment information on a daily basis, and included weekly features.

== Information providers ==
There were two types of information provider (IP): main IPs, and sub-IPs.

=== Charges ===
==== Page rental ====
A main IP rented pages from the Post Office (initially) or British Telecom (later), and controlled a three-digit master-page in the database. In 1982, this cost an annual £5,500 for a basic package, equivalent to around £29,000 in 2021.

The basic package included 100 frames; the ability to enter and amend information, retrieve response frames, and store 10 completed response frames; staff training in editing (a two-day seminar), and a copy of the IP editing manual; and, if required, bulk update facilities and an annual print-out of frames in use. Additional frames were available, in batches of 500, for £500 a year (over £2,600 in 2021), while using "Closed User Groups" (CUGs) (Note: A Closed User Group, or CUG, was a group of Prestel users, set up by an Information Provider, with access to confidential information.) and the sub-IP facility each cost £250 annually (over £1,300 in 2021).

Sub-IPs – those with smaller requirements or budget – rented pages from a main IP. A main IP could rent out pages at the market rate. Such IPs were known as "umbrella" IPs. Sub-IPs paid a per-minute charge for editing online: in 1982, this was 8p per minute from Monday to Friday between 8 am and 6 pm, and 8p per four-minute block at all other times Sub-IPs had a four-digit (or more) master-page within a main IP's area. Generally speaking, they could only edit existing pages, and were not able to create or delete them.

==== Gateway ====
The cost to an IP of connecting an external computer to the Prestel system varied according to the number of simultaneous users required, the distance between Prestel and the IP's computer, and whether the connection was made using a private line or via the PSS packet-switched network. There were also time and data-volume charges. Other factors to be taken into account included the traffic pattern (i.e., the expected volume and frequency of data flows), the response time required (as perceived by a user), the size of the database to be accessed, and the changeability of the information stored.

In 1985, British Telecom estimated that for an IP using a typical minicomputer (such as the PDP-11) located 100 km from London and handling up to 10 users simultaneously at peak times, the one-off software set-up cost would be at least £16,000, communication costs would range from £4,280 to £5,550 a year (depending on the type of connection), and Prestel usage would cost £8,600 a year.

=== Relationships ===
Several typical relationships developed between umbrella IPs and their sub-IP clients. A sub-IP could be:

- An independent supplier of information, with exclusive or partial editorial control and full or partial editing rights.
- An organisation making information available to an IP, sometimes on a royalty basis.
- An organisation advertising on an IP's pages.
- An individual authoring articles or columns for an IP, usually on a royalty basis.

In addition, the IP Micronet 800 used the sub-IP facility to offer the "Gallery" service, where a group, club, or individual could rent one or a number of frames cheaply, and for short periods if required.

An analysis in 1981 of the pros and cons of using an umbrella IP to publish information on Prestel concluded that if the owner of the information needed less than 500 frames, it would be cheaper to use an umbrella IP, but if over 5000, this would be more expensive than doing it themselves. In between these two figures, speed, convenience, and the need for design skills favoured using an IP, while going it alone assured confidentiality and provided more control.

=== Editing pages ===
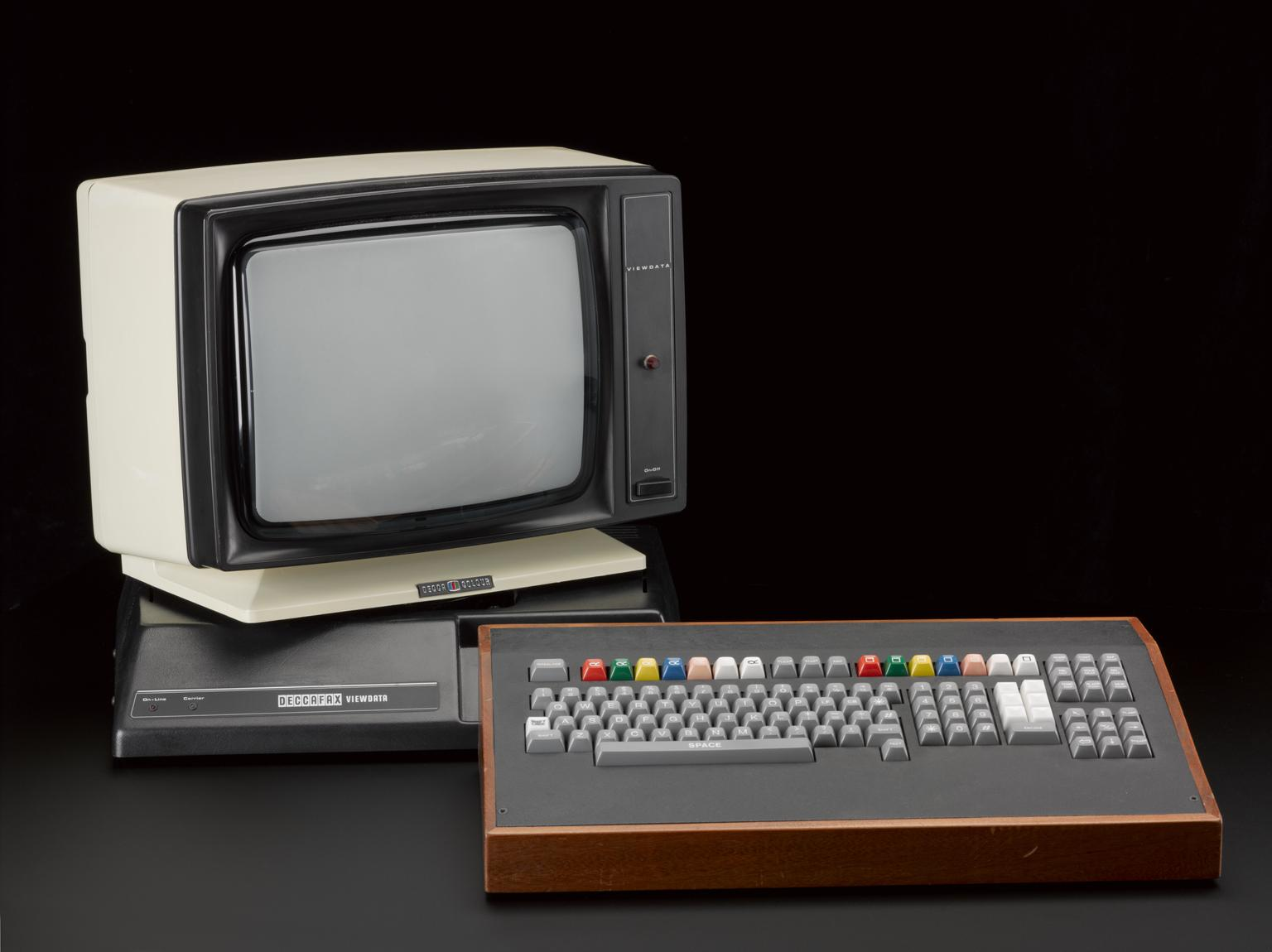
Cherry Editing Keyboard manufactured by Cherry GmbH, connected to a Deccafax Viewdata Terminal Model VP1 manufactured (1979–1994) by Decca Radio & Television. Keyboard 11 x 50 x 31 cm, terminal 42 x 45 x 45 cm, 28 kg

There were two ways to edit pages: directly, by creating or amending them using special editing keyboards while connected online to the main Update Computer; or offline, creating pages locally and uploading them in bulk. Bulk update required that pages be created offline using editing terminals that could store pages, or by using microcomputers. The pages were then either transmitted to the Update Computer online as a batch via a special dialup port and protocol, or sent on magnetic tape to the Update Centre (UDC), where they were uploaded.

Using the online editor, IPs were also able to view information about a page hidden from ordinary users, such as the time and date of its last update, whether the frame was in a Closed User Group (CUG), the price-to-view (if any), and the "frame count" – the number of times the frame had been accessed. (Note: The frame count was not cumulated over all IRCs, but related only to the computer being viewed at the time: calculating national access counts was a manual exercise.)

IPs and sub-IPs accessed the Edit computer using their normal ID and password, but had a separate password to access the editing facility. Bulk uploads only required the edit password and the IP's account number.

== Information and services ==
Prestel's pre-launch promotional material focused on the general public:

Prestel is for everyone. Busy mothers can check out prices before they go shopping or their children can use Prestel to help them with their homework. Gardeners will have a constant source of information on what they should be doing at any particular time of the year. Whole families can choose and even book their holidays through Prestel. [..] Prestel will provide you with listings for theatres, cinemas, sporting events, exhibitions and just about anything else that may be going on.

When the service launched in late 1979, Post Office Telecommunications had a hands-off approach towards managing whatever IPs placed on the system. This changed in early 1980, when British Telecom (its successor) started targeting the business, professional and hobbyist markets via joint ventures with companies and organisations with specialised expertise.

=== Specialised services ===
By the mid-1980s, the specialised services on Prestel included:

- Prestel CitiService, involving the London Stock Exchange and ICV Information Systems, targeted three groups: the business community as a whole, with mainly company information; private investors in a closed user group, offering regularly updated share prices; and for brokers and other investment professionals, continuously updated share prices, also in a closed user group.
- British Telecom Travel Service provided travel agents with information from tour operators, airlines, and other transport operators, and enabled online reservations. Services for other users included flight arrivals and departures, car rental, and exchange rates.
- Prestel Farmlink packaged information for farmers from the Ministry of Agriculture, Fisheries and Food, the Meat and Livestock Commission, the Meteorological Office, and others. A link to Prestel CitiService provided farm commodity prices, and farmers could calculate, online, weekly wages and the formulation of feedstuffs.
- Banking: the Nottingham Building Society offered Homelink, and the Bank of Scotland HOBS, the Home & Office Banking Service. Subscribers were provided with free or subsidised Prestel terminals.
- Prestel Microcomputing offered downloadable software (telesoftware), noticeboards, newsletters, and reviews. It incorporated Micronet 800 from EMAP, Viewfax 258, and Clubspot 810.
- Prestel Education targeted schools and colleges, and provided course and careers advice, educational software, and help with using computers.
- British Telecom Insurance Services provided financial information to insurance intermediaries and enabled them to get online quotes from major insurance companies.
- Prestel Teleshopping was a specialised e-commerce service for the residential market, and involved Littlewoods, Grattan, and Kays Catalogues, among others.
- Prestel for Medical Practitioners packaged material from bodies such as the Royal College of General Practitioners, the British Medical Association, and the Department of Health and Social Security with drug data from pharmaceutical companies, information on locum vacancies, conference and training diaries, and research news.

== Messaging ==
=== Response frames ===
A "response frame" enabled a user to send a message to an IP using a preformatted page to order goods or services or to transmit data. The user's name and other information needed (such as their address) were automatically added to the frame from their Prestel account details.

Initially, response frames had to be collected by an IP from each IRC in turn; later, they were ingathered at the UDC, where the IP concerned could retrieve them. Eventually, with the introduction of Mailbox, response frames could be retrieved from any IRC. § Network

=== Mailbox ===
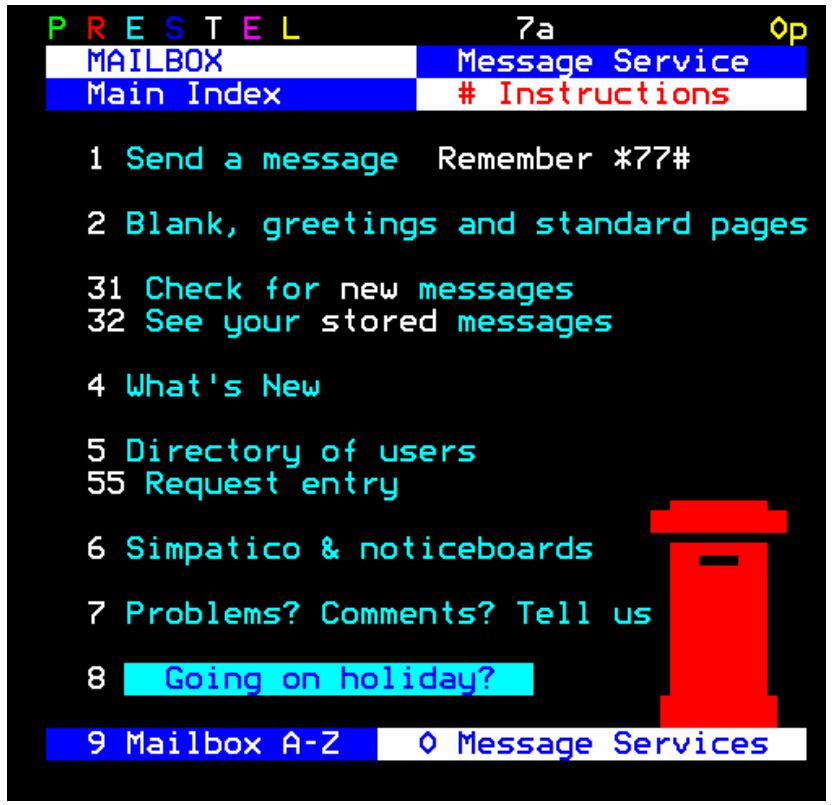
Launch version of Prestel Mailbox entry page, *7# (1981)

Prestel Mailbox was launched in September 1981. Initially hosted on a computer in London, it was made available UK-wide in September 1984. § Network

The entry page was *7#. This linked to pages where messages could be composed, stored messages retrieved, and standard, pre-formatted messages completed – many designs were available, including greetings cards, invitations, and seasonal messages such as valentines.

To prepare a basic message, a blank message page (*77#) was displayed, with the sender's Mailbox number pre-filled and blank fields for entering the recipient's number and the message text. There was space for about 100 words, and fewer if graphics were used. After addressing (with a Mailbox number) and writing the message, the user was offered the choice of keying 1 to send, or 2 to not send. Successful dispatch led to a confirmation page; if there were problems, such as a mistake in entering the recipient's number, an error message was displayed. Sending a message to more than one recipient meant re-keying the text into a new message page, although some microcomputers allowed the original message to be stored and then copy-pasted.

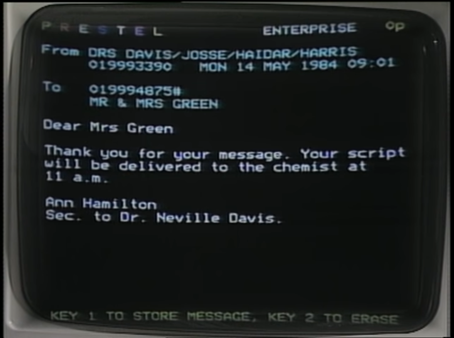
Screenshot of a received message. The name of the host computer is at top-right. The Mailbox numbers start with 01999, so are ex-directory. At bottom are instructions for storing or deleting the message.

Mailbox numbers were derived from the last nine digits of a user's phone number. For example, the Mailbox number for Prestel HQ, with the phone number 01-822-2211, was 018222211. Numbers were listed on page *486#. Ex-directory numbers were available on request. (Note: Ex-directory Prestel Mailbox numbers used a dummy phone number format starting with 01999 or 01111.)

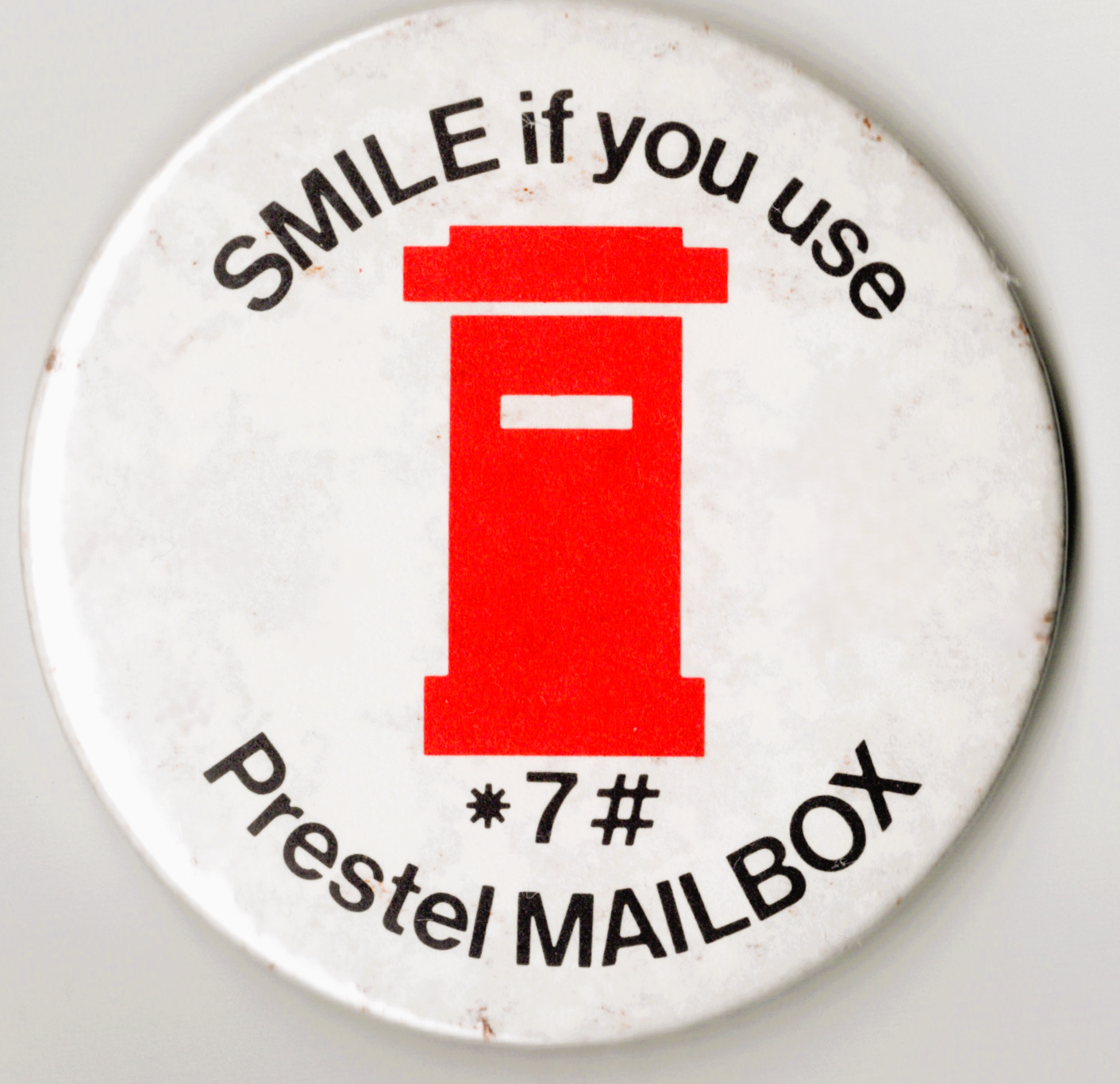
Prestel Mailbox promotional badge, c.1983. Metal, 5.6 cm diameter

When a user connected to Prestel, a banner on their Welcome page alerted them to any new messages, and when signing off via *90#, a warning would appear if any new messages had arrived in the meantime, with the option to read them before disconnecting. Messages were retrieved from page *930#, where they were presented in chronological order. After reading a new message, a user had to choose between deleting or saving it before the next message was presented. Three messages could be stored at a time, and were accessible via page *931#.

Using this first version of Prestel Mailbox was free of additional charges. § Mailbox upgrade

==== Simpatico ====
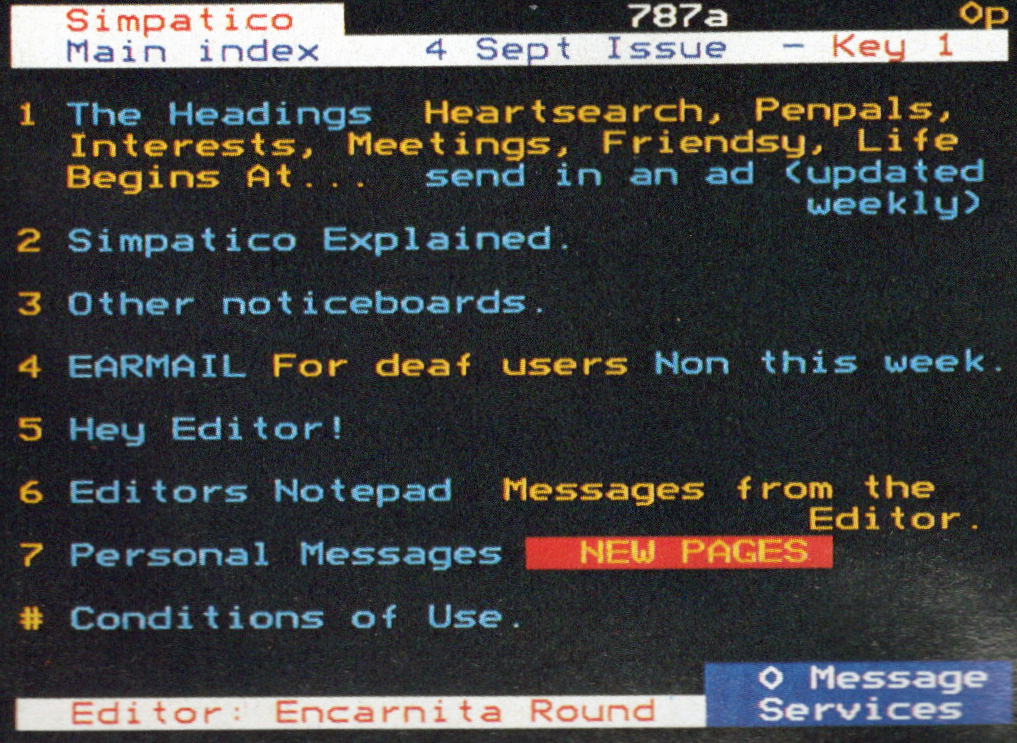
Simpatico entry page (1985).

Simpatico was a free small ads service run by Prestel on page *787#. Users sent in their ads on a preformatted Mailbox page, with responses made via Mailbox. Ads were vetted and grouped under the headings of Heartsearch, Penpals, Interests & Hobbies, Meetings, Groups & Events, Friendsy (for younger users), and Life Begins At ...

=== Telex Link ===
Prestel Mailbox was extended in September 1984 to give access to the UK Telex service via "Telex Link". On *8#, the Telex Link entry page, a message could be composed and the telex number entered before sending the telex like a standard message. Telex Link added the necessary telex codes and tried to send the message several times before confirming receipt (or failure) via Mailbox.

In September 1985, the service was enhanced to enable telexes to be sent to and received from anywhere in the world. A telex could be sent to a Mailbox user from any telex terminal by using 295141 TXLINK G, the Telex Link number, as the telex address, and entering "MBX", followed by the Prestel user's Mailbox number, as the first line of the telex. An incoming telex appeared to the Prestel recipient as an ordinary Mailbox message, with the telex number of the sender added at the top of the screen.

Sending a telex cost 50p for UK destinations, £1.00 for Europe, £2.00 for North America, £3.00 for elsewhere in the world, and £5.00 for sending to ships (via INMARSAT). There was no charge for receiving one.

Telex Link was upgraded in 1987, with connections to more telex lines and faster delivery times, and its address changed to 934999 TXLINK G.

=== Mailbox upgrade ===
A new messaging system was introduced in July 1989. This enabled messages up to five frames long, storing messages before sending, sending to multiple recipients (either individually or via a mailing list), message forwarding, and acknowledgment of receipt. Basic word-processing was also possible.

Sending a message without using any of these new facilities remained free: all the new options were charged at 1p per use per recipient. For the first time, sending spam was permitted at a cost of 20p per message per recipient. In addition, the stored message facility was replaced by a summary page listing all the messages, both new and old, that were waiting: the user could then pick which message to view, rather than needing to read through them in chronological order.

=== Message statistics ===
Nearly two years after the introduction of Mailbox in autumn 1981 on a computer in London, Prestel stated that a total of c. 125,000 Mailbox messages had been sent. By early 1984, users were exchanging emails at the rate of about 61,000 per month and sending an additional 125,000 response frames to IPs. 71,000 monthly emails were recorded soon after, and Prestel reported average monthly figures of 86,000 emails and 106,000 response frames for the period just before Mailbox became nationally available in autumn 1984. (Note: The "Prestel Briefing" sources cited state that these figures "do not include activity conducted with external computers through Prestel Gateways".)

In September 1985, the British Telecom executive responsible for Prestel stated that 100,000 "electronic mail messages" – referring to the sum of Mailbox messages and response frames – were being sent each week. This average weekly figure rose to 130,000 in December 1985.

=== Hack ===
A security breach of the Prestel mailbox of Prince Philip, Duke of Edinburgh occurred in November 1984 as part of a wider hack of Prestel.

== Infrastructure ==
=== Terminals ===
During the development phase of Prestel, British Telecom's research department produced a Prestel terminal specification. This formed the basis of design and type-approval discussions with, initially, manufacturers of TVs, and later with suppliers of other forms of terminal.

Several types of Prestel terminal were produced:

- integrated residential terminals, typically based on television sets;
- integrated business terminals;
- adaptors for television sets;
- adaptors for microcomputers, with associated or standalone editing software;
- editing terminals.

=== Network ===
==== Configuration and growth ====
In March 1979, the Post Office launched a limited "London Residential Service" for subscribers in the capital. This was based on the computer used in an earlier test phase to both store the Prestel database and enable IPs to make updates to their pages.

When the full commercial service launched in September 1979, three new computer centres were opened in London. Two, known as Byron and Juniper, were "Information Retrieval Centres" (IRCs): their computers each contained a copy of the Prestel database, and were accessible by users. The third, Duke, was Prestel's "Update Centre" (UDC): IPs used this to create, modify or delete their pages, with their updates sent to the IRCs. (Note: The computer centres in London were first located in St Alphage House, together with Prestel's National Operations Centre (NOC). The computers and the NOC were later moved to Baynard House, which acted as a combined UDC and IRC. Both types of machine remained in service there till Prestel was discontinued in 1994.) A fourth IRC, Dickens, opened in Birmingham in December.

IRCs were connected to the UDC in a star network configuration using leased-line connections (based on the X.25 protocol) operating at 2400 baud. This network handled about 2,000 Prestel terminals and provided users with over 160,000 pages supplied by around 130 IPs. By mid-1981, this arrangement had been replaced by dedicated X.25 circuits using the then-new PSS packet-switched network and operating at 4.8 kbit/s. Each IRC typically housed two information retrieval computers, though some in London had a single machine. IRCs were usually located in telephone exchanges.

By June 1980, the network had grown to four individual information-retrieval computers in London, and six others installed in pairs in each of Birmingham, Edinburgh and Manchester, making ten in all. These ten computers could initially connect to around 1000 user ports, expandable to 2000. At this point, the Prestel database contained about 164,000 pages with expandability to up to 260,000 built in: allowing for system management pages, this arrangement capped the size of the public database at around 250,000 frames.

By September 1980, there were five IRC machines in London and pairs of machines in Birmingham, Nottingham, Edinburgh, Glasgow, Manchester, Liverpool and Belfast, offering a total of 914 user ports. Further IRCs were planned in Luton, Reading, Sevenoaks, Brighton, Leeds, Newcastle, Cardiff, Bristol, Bournemouth, Chelmsford and Norwich by the end of 1980. By the end of 1980, 1500 user ports were available.

As of July 1981, the number of IRC computers had grown to 18: this increased the percentage of phone subscribers who could access Prestel at local call rates from 30% to 62%. In April 1984, Prestel announced that this had risen to 94%, and in February 1986, to 98%.

==== International access ====
In late 1981, an IRC called Jefferson opened in Boston, Massachusetts, giving US subscribers access to Prestel via the American Telenet packet-switched network.

==== Mailbox computer ====
Mailbox, the Prestel messaging service, was launched on Enterprise computer, and allowed messaging only between users accessing that machine. By 1984, Mailbox had been rolled out nationwide using a dedicated computer in London known as Pandora.

=== Hardware ===
Prestel's computers were based on the GEC 4000 series minicomputer. The main IRC machines were originally model GEC 4082s equipped with 384 Kbyte memory-core stores, six 70 Mbyte hard disk drives, and 100 ports. (Note: By 1981, this configuration had changed: memory was doubled to 768 kbytes and data discs reduced to six (corresponding to the number at the IRC machines), with a single transaction disc.) This set-up accommodated an initial 1500 Prestel users.

Each IRC computer had 208 ports. With eight reserved for testing and control, a computer could support up to 200 simultaneous Prestel users. For the ordinary user, access was via an asynchronous, duplex interface provided by banks of multiplexers. These, in turn, were accessed via standard modems, operating at 1200/75 bit/s, directly connected to the public phone network.

Besides the multiplexers required to support 1200/75 dial-up access, the Update Centre machines were also connected to special modems that handled online bulk updating by IPs. Banks of 300/300 bit/s full-duplex asynchronous V.21 modems supported direct IP-computer-to-Prestel-computer links, while 1200 bit/s half-duplex V.23 modems supported access by IPs using editing terminals that stored frames offline before uploading them. In addition, twin 9-track NRZI tape decks of 800 bytes/inch capacity were provided for bulk offline updates.

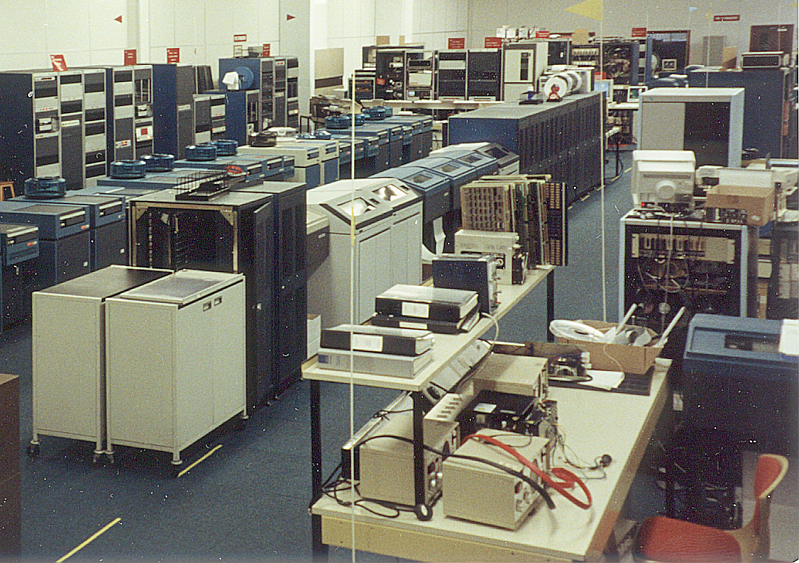
GEC 4000 series computers at GEC Computers' Dunstable Development Centre, 1991

Though categorised as a minicomputer, GEC 4000 series machines were large: one occupied several standard computer cabinets each standing 6 feet (1.8 m) high by 2 feet (0.61 m) wide. The CDC 9762 hard disc drives were housed separately in large, stand-alone units about the size of a domestic washing machine. (Note: The 70 Mbyte capacity hard discs were removable. Each consisted of a stack of five, 14-inch (36 cm) diameter platters, standing 4 inches (10 cm) high, that could be lifted in and out of the drive unit.) A GEC machine cost over £200,000 at standard prices, in addition to which were the costs of the associated communications equipment. Combining the two to assemble a single IRC was a major undertaking, and took some 15 months from order placement to commissioning.

=== Software ===
GEC 4000 series computers could run on several operating systems. The Prestel machines used OS4000, which was developed by GEC and supported BABBAGE, the high-level assembler in which all Prestel software was written.

The pilot-trial system had five core software components: input process, output process, gate-keeper process, disc-handler process, and several task processes. input received data from a Prestel user; gate accepted characters, one at a time, from input and fed them to a task; the key frame-getter task fetched a fresh page or the next frame of an already-displayed page from disc. output then displayed a whole frame, preceded by a clear-screen command, to the user.

The commercial service had several important additional functions, including an editing program and bulk update facilities, closed user groups, messages, user billing and IP revenue allocation, optional additional user passwords, error-reporting routines, system manager facilities, and statistics-collecting routines.

In 1987, a Prestel Admin computer was introduced to support the user registration process. It captured a new user's details from the paper Prestel application form, transferred the data to the relevant Prestel computer, and then printed the welcome letter to be sent to the user concerned. (Note: The Prestel Admin computer, which was also based on GEC 4082 equipment, was the first to be equipped with the 1 Mbyte of memory needed to support the use of the Rapport relational database product supplied by Logica.)

=== Monitoring ===
Users' connections to Prestel were monitored by a device known as VAMPIRE – Viewdata Access Monitor and Priority Incident Reporting Equipment. Via private circuits connected to an IRC computer's ports, this produced a continuously updated display on a monitoring screen at the Prestel Regional Centre responsible for an IRC. The screen showed a matrix of small squares, each corresponding to a port on an IRC computer. Free ports were green, occupied ones yellow, incoming calls-to-connect by Prestel users were pale blue, and faulty ports red. In this way, the overall status of an IRC machine could be summarised and seen at a glance.

The response time of the Prestel system was measured by a microcomputer-based device known as PET. This monitored frame retrieval times for users and how quickly frame-editing commands issued by IP editors were implemented. PET operated in conjunction with a hardware performance monitor that recorded central processing unit and disk-drive usage.

== International sales ==
Prestel software and knowhow was sold to the state PTTs of several countries, including Austria, Australia, former West Germany, the then-British colony of Hong Kong, Italy, Malaysia, the Netherlands, Singapore, and Switzerland. A private telecommunications company, GTE, bought the system in the USA.

== See also ==
- Bildschirmtext – German videotex service
- Micronet 800 – 1980s online magazine on Prestel
- Minitel – French videotex service
- Singapore Teleview – Singaporean videotex service
- Telidon – Canadian videotex/teletext service
- videotex – End-user information system
- Viewtron – US videotex service
