= Telecom Gold =

Defunct British email service

Telecom Gold (sometimes also known as BT Gold) was an early commercial electronic mail service launched by British Telecom in 1982. It was based on Prime minicomputers running Dialcom software under a customised version of PRIMOS. (ITT Dialcom was later acquired by BT in 1986.) The system offered various services, including e-mail to and from other Telecom Gold users and those of Dialcom services in other countries, and other e-mail systems such as Sprint and integration with telex, fax, online databases and an experimental OCR system for a short while. Later, X.400 functionality was added.

Users would dial into the system using a conventional modem and terminal emulator. Alternatively, users could dial a local number and connect via the PSS X.25 network. The X.400 services also had a Mail User Agent which ran on IBM PCs and compatibles.

The UK data centre was originally located in the basement of Beckett House 60-68 St Thomas St, Bermondsey, London, SE1 3QU but later moved to a custom built facility at Oxgate Centre, Oxgate Ln, London NW2 7JA which now houses LDEX1.

The service eventually became obsolete with the growth of the Internet in 1996:

Although BT continued to market the service, it decided not to develop its [Telecom Gold] successor, Mailbox, into an Internet Service Provider when it became clear that people wanted to connect to the Internet during the early to mid 1990s. Instead, BT decided to launch a new Internet Service Provider, called BTnet, in 1994, and within two years, Mailbox had ceased to exist.

— Rutter (2005) p.195

During the 1980s, BT Gold hosted one of the first online communities. Users communicated using a noticeboard (noticebd) and via a simple chat facility which allowed real-time conversations to take place. The BT Gold community was worldwide, but the majority of users were in London and would meet regularly at "eyeballs" (coined from CB usage).

== See also ==
- Robert Schifreen & Steve Gold, alleged hackers of Prince Philip's Telecom Gold mailbox in 1985
